= List of tourist attractions in Pune =

Pune is the second largest city of Maharashtra state, India and is surrounded by the Sahyadri Mountain range. It occupied an important place during the Maratha Empire between 1674 and 1881. Hence, it homes numerous forts and wadas highlighting typical Maratha architecture. Forts are one of the main attractions including Lohagad and Visapur Forts. It also has rich cultural and spiritual history with many temples and ashrams spread across the city. In addition to local adventure and history junkies, Pune also attracts many international tourist because of Osho International Meditation Resort that is located in heart of Pune at Koregaon Park.

Pune is the cultural capital of the Indian state Maharastra. The city is known as the "Oxford of the east".

== Amusements, parks, studio and zoos ==
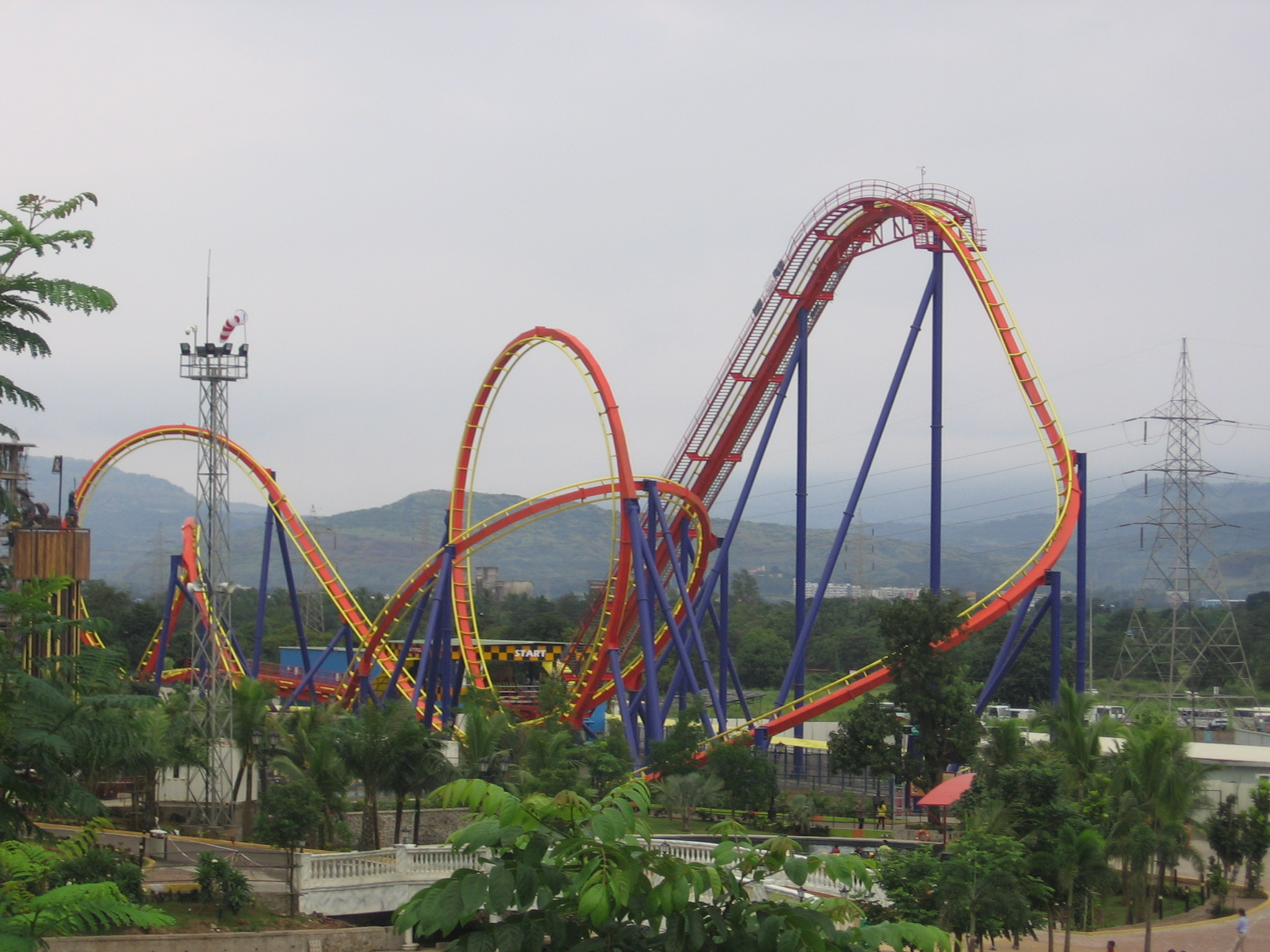
Imagicaa

- Appu ghar
- Diamond Water Park
- Imagicaa
- Krushnai Water Park
- Lavasa - A planned city, stylistically based on the Italian town Portofino.
- Pimpri-Chinchwad Science park
- Pimpri-Chinchwad Planeterium
- Pune-Okayama Friendship Garden
- Rajiv Gandhi Zoological Park
- Sentosa Water Park
- Wet and Joy Water Park

== Forts ==
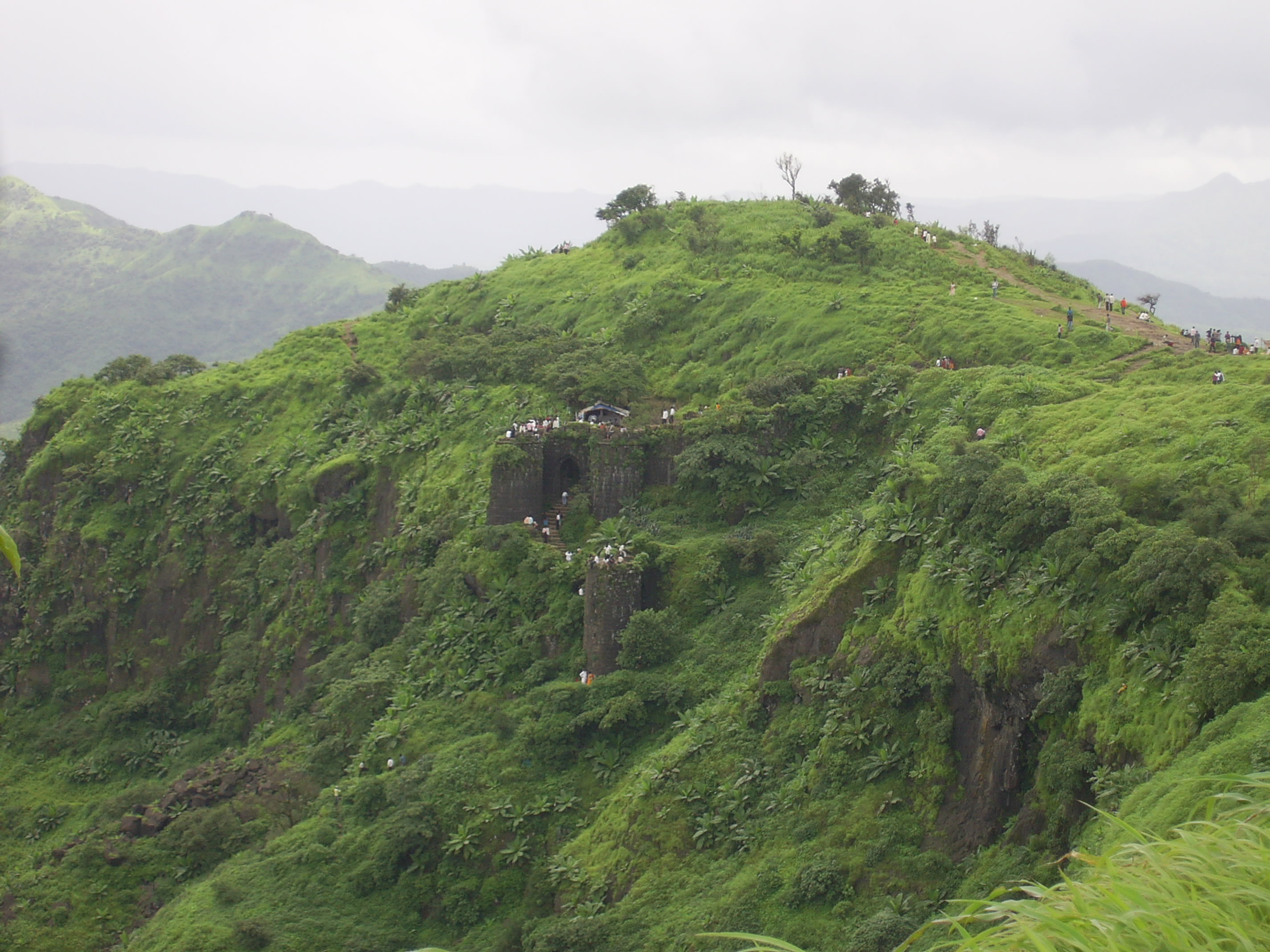
A view of Sinhagad Fort

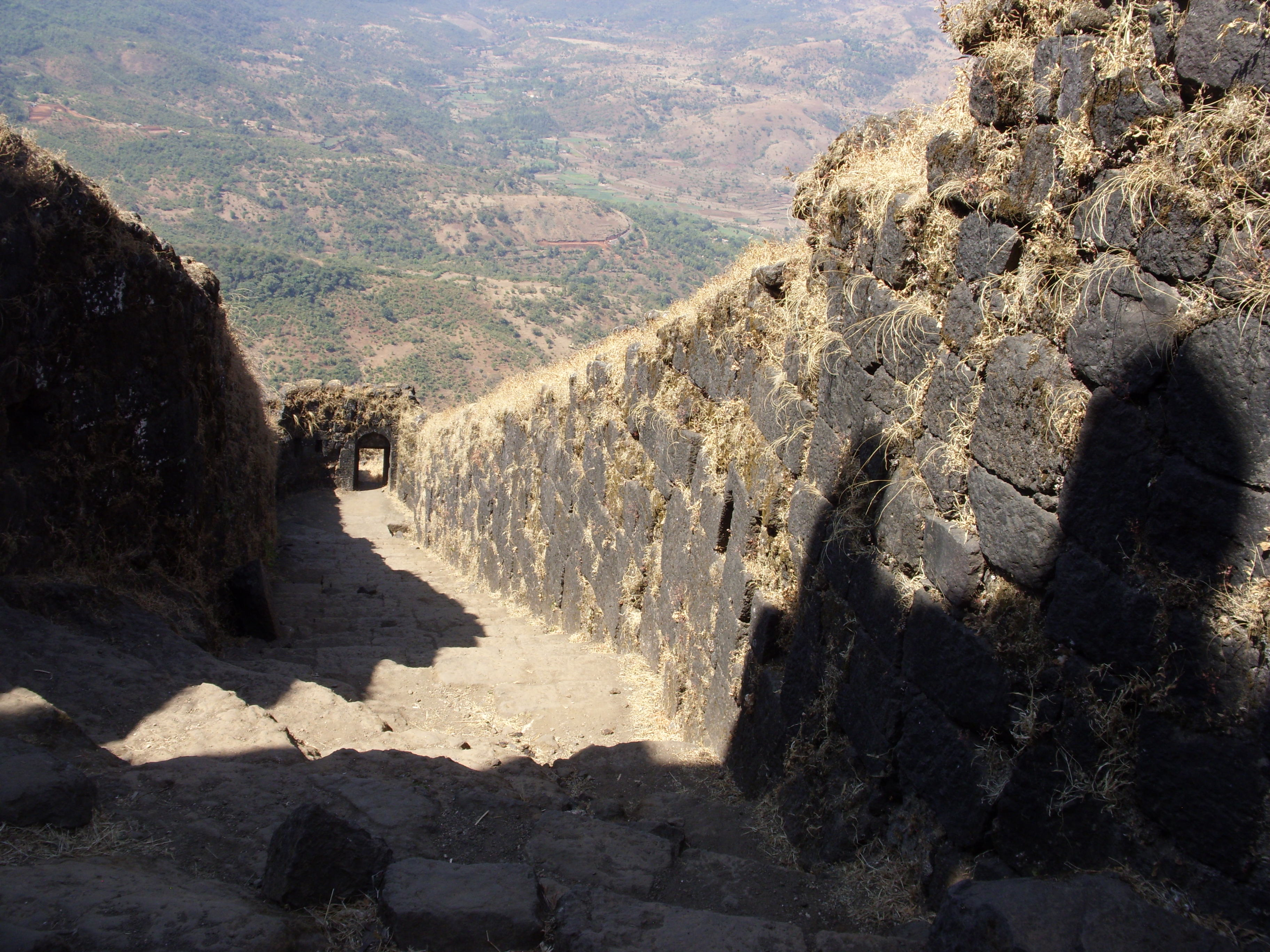
Rajgad Fort

- Sinhagad
- Shaniwar Wada
- Aga Khan Palace
- Shivneri
- Rajgad
- Torna
- Purandar
- Rohida
- Tung
- Hadsar
- Malhargad
- Koraigad
- Ghangad
- Lohagad
- Visapur Fort
- Tikona
- Mohangad
- Raigad
- Kenjalgad

=== Lohagad and Visapur Forts ===
Lohagad and Visapur Forts are located about 65 km to the west of Pune. The forts were primarily built to boost trade by safeguarding the important trade route through Bhor Ghat. The forts can be easily reached by roadways or railways. Trains are available from Pune to Malavali Railway Station, which is the nearest railways station to these twin forts. One needs to then travel by road to the small village of Lohgad Wadi which lies just next to the forts.

The two forts are unique in their formation and connected together by a ridge which is popularly known as ‘gaymukh’. There are four massive doors on the way to forts. They are named as Ganesh, Narayan, Hanuman and Mahadarwaja. There are some inscriptions that suggest that the Ganesh door was built during the rule of Nana Phadanavis. There is a 1500-meter-long wall that surrounds the fort and is easily visible from a long distance. The width of the wall is 30 meters. On the eastern side of the Lohagad Fort, there is a huge hole that is easily visible by the passing train from a very far distance.

Visapur Fort is located adjacent to Lohagad Fort and one needs to walk around a long wall to get to this unique fort. Visapur Fort was built after Lohagad Fort during 1713–1720 CE by Balaji Vishwanath, who was the first Peshwa of the Maratha Empire. There is a long wall that forms a fortification around Visapur Fort. The hill on which this fort is built is also famous for its historical caves of Bhaje that existed even before the fort was built. These caves are also important for the historians because of their Buddhist connection. There are a few stone houses located on this hill which is believed to the home of Peshwas. Apart from the stone houses and caves, once can also find some iron guns and cannons that give glimpses of the Maratha Rule. A lot of people also come to visit a huge idol of Lord Hanuman on the hill.

With a number of forts in and around Pune there are some trekking places like The Taljai hill, Hanuman tekdi, Vetal tekdi which are most preferred places for treks or for jogging. Khadkawasla, Pawna, Mulsi and Panshet dams are most visited places during the monsoon, they are like a weekend nature retreat for tourists.

== Lakes and dams ==
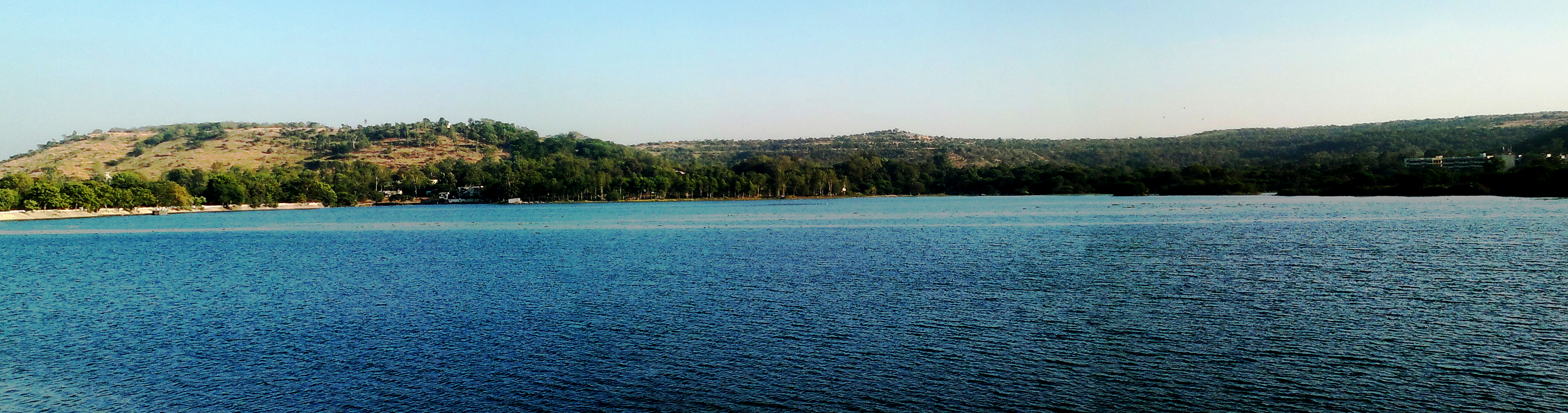
Pashan Lake

- Bird Valley Lake
- Kasarsai Lake
- Talegaon Lake
- Khadakwasla Dam
- Koyna Dam
- Mulshi Dam
- Panshet Dam
- Pashan Lake
- Temghar Dam

== Museums ==
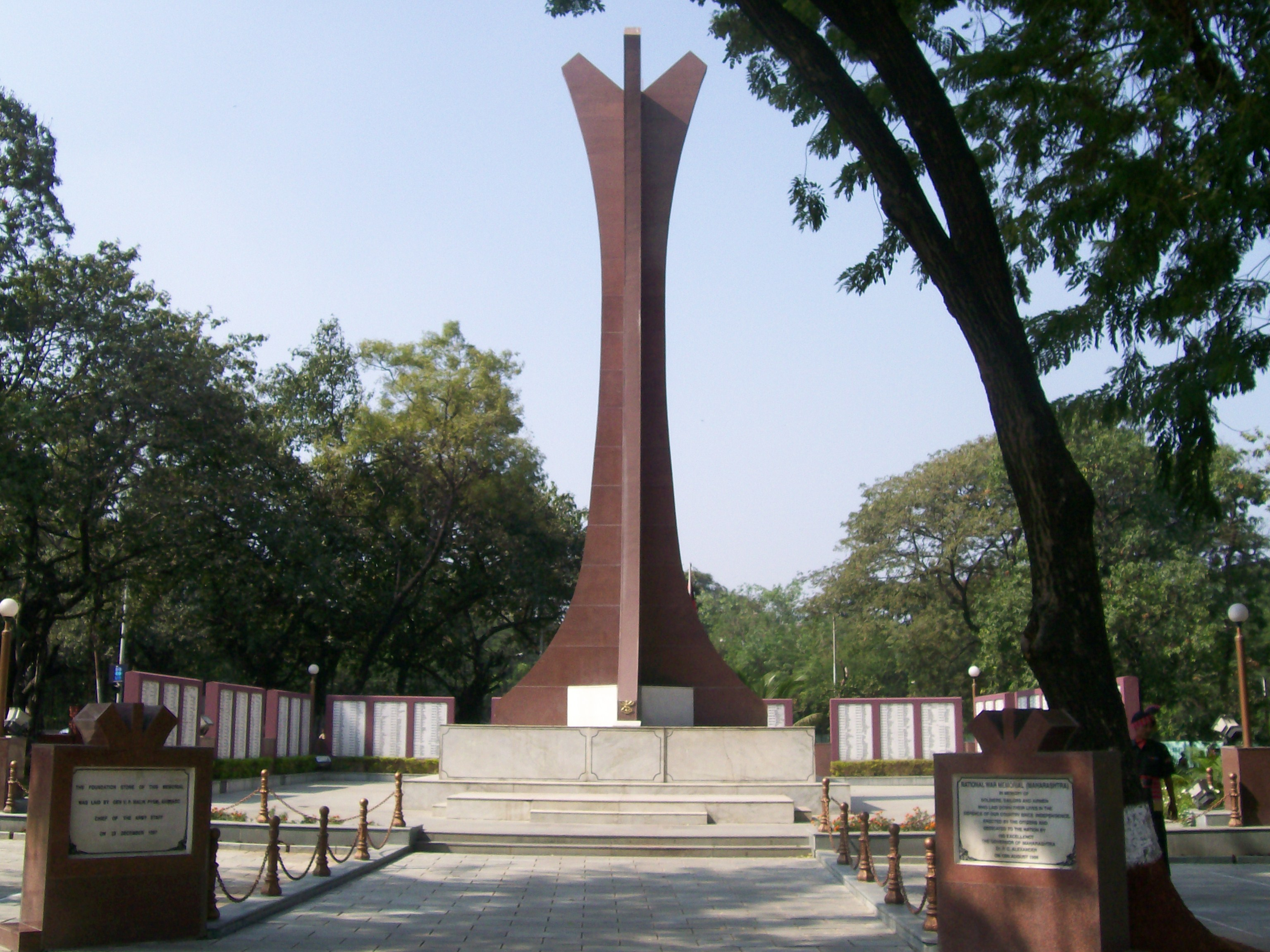
The National War Memorial Southern Command in Pune Cantonment

- Darshan Museum
- Raja Dinkar Kelkar Museum
- Pune Tribal Museum
- Mahatama Phule Museum
- Tilak Museum
- Chhatrapati Shivaji Maharaj Museum of Indian History
- Blades of Glory Cricket Museum
- Joshi's Museum of Miniature Railway
- National War Memorial Southern Command
- Honey Bee Museum, CBRTI

== Places of worship ==
=== Churches ===
- All Saints Church, Pune
- St. Mary's Church, Pune
- St. Patrick's Cathedral, Pune

=== Temples ===
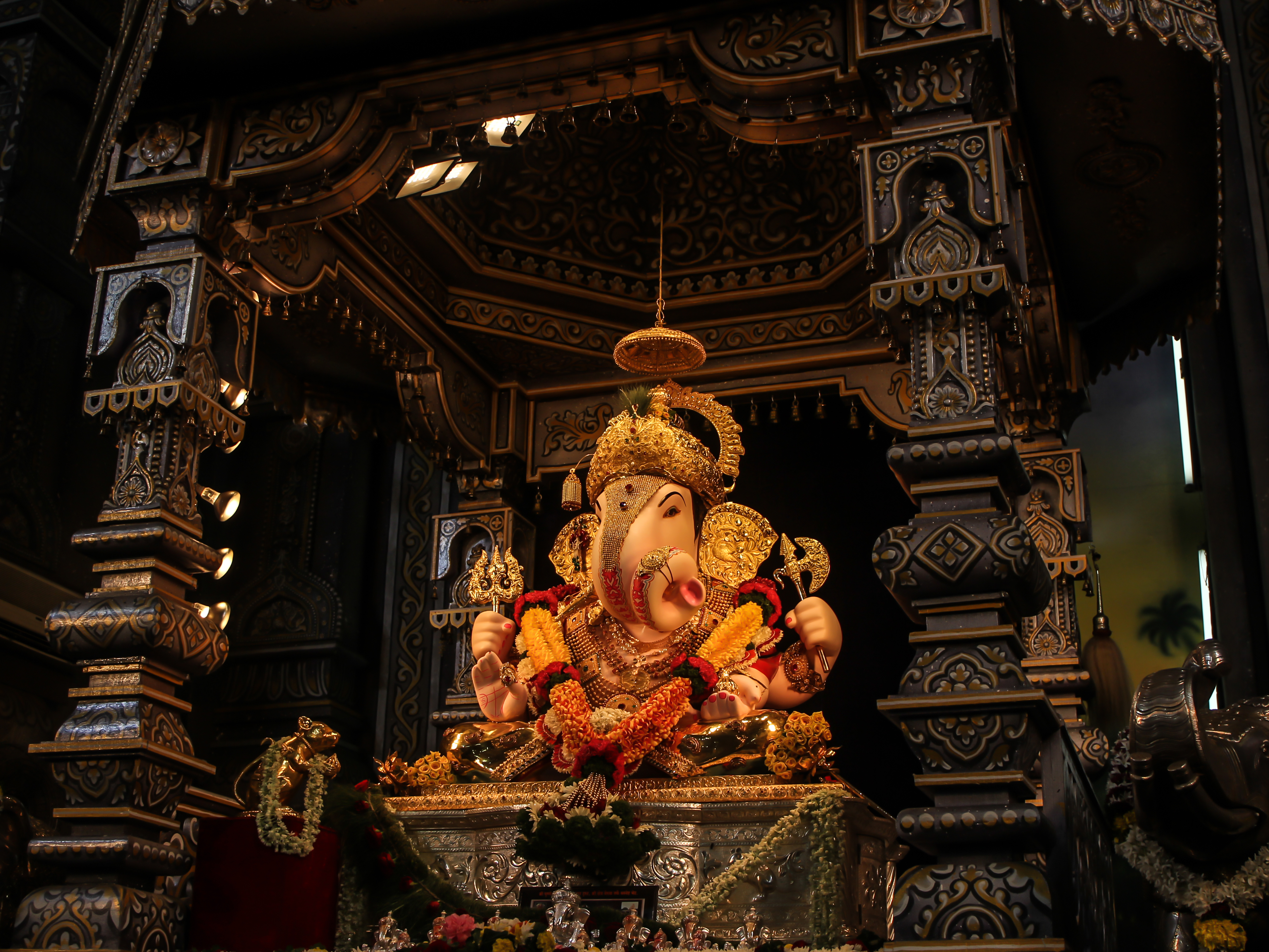
Dagdusheth Ganpati, Pune

- Dagadusheth Halwai Ganapati Temple is dedicated to the Hindu God Ganesh. The temple is popular in Maharashtra and is visited by thousands of pilgrims every year.Devotees of the temple include celebrities and Chief Ministers of Maharashtra who visit during the annual ten-day Ganeshotsav festival. The main Ganesh idol is insured for sum of ₹10 million (US$160,000). People are celebrating 125 years of celebration for this Ganapati in the year 2017.
- BAPS Shri Swaminarayan Mandir
- Bhuleshwar Temple
- Chaturshringi Temple
- ISKCON NVCC Temple
- Birla Ganpati Temple|Prati Shirdi Temple Talegaon
- Ranjangaon Ganpati Temple
- Katraj Jain Temple
- Morgaon Mayureshwar Temple
- Parvati Temple
- Pataleshwar Caves, Pune
- Ramdara Mandir
- Sant Dnyaneshwar's Samadhi Mandir
- Sarasbaug Ganpati Temple
- Shree Baba Maharaj Sahsrabuddhe Samadhi Mandir
- Shri Satya Sai Pandurang Kshetra
- Shri Laxmi Narsimha Temple
- Shri Wagheshwar Temple
- Sri Balaji Mandir
- Trishundha Ganpati Temple
- Ramkrishna Math

== Park ==
- Empress garden
- Gram Sanskruti Udyan Village Park
- Kamla Nehru Park
- Osho Garden
- Pu La Deshpande Garden
- Seven Wonders Dream Park
- Sambhaji Park.

== Markets and shopping ==
- Mahatma Gandhi Road
- Hong Kong Lane

== Malls in Pune ==
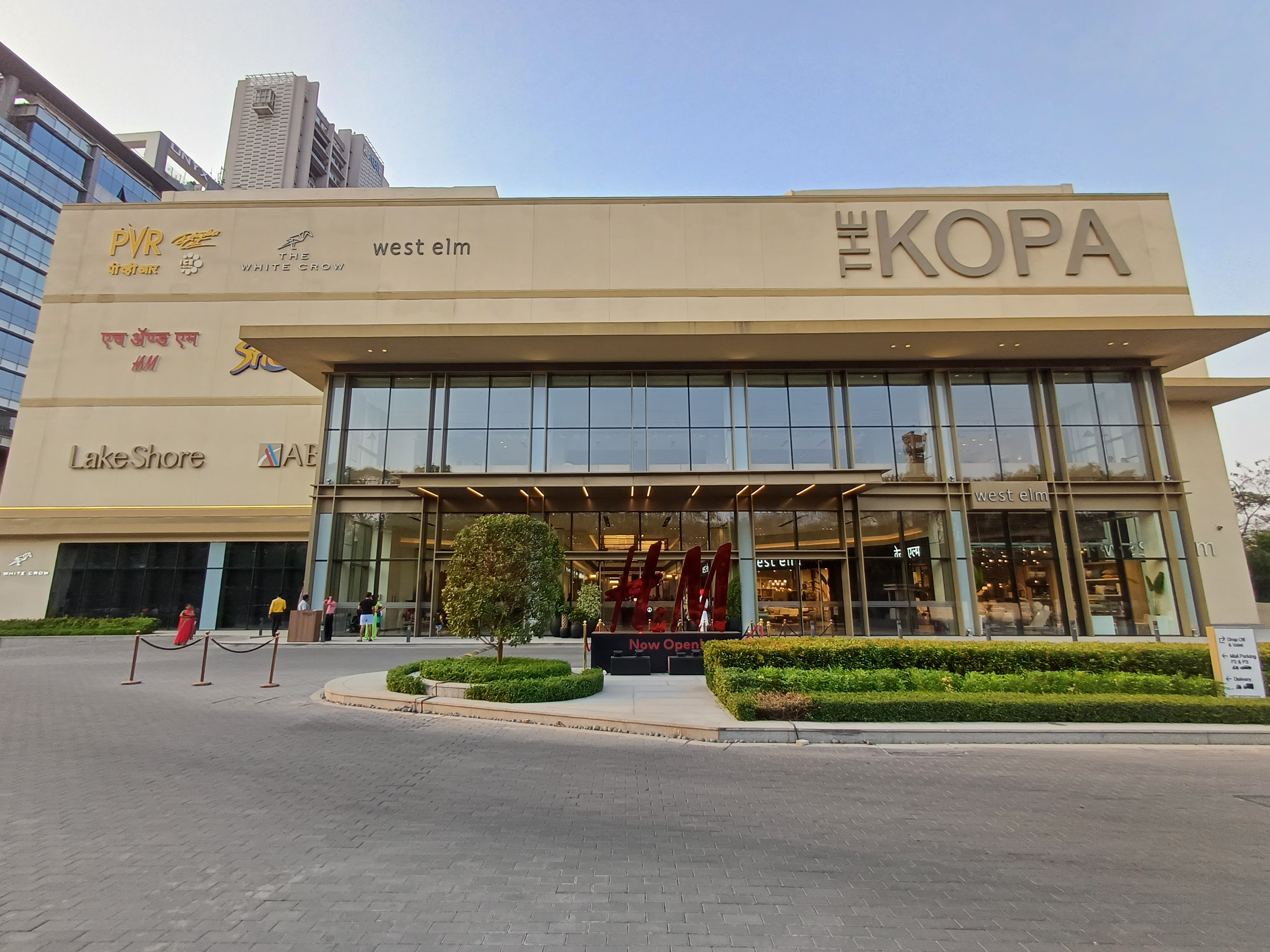
Kopa Mall

- Amanora Mall
- Phoenix Marketcity (Pune)
- Seasons Mall
- 93 Avenue
