= Korigad =

Hill fort in Pune district, Maharashtra, India

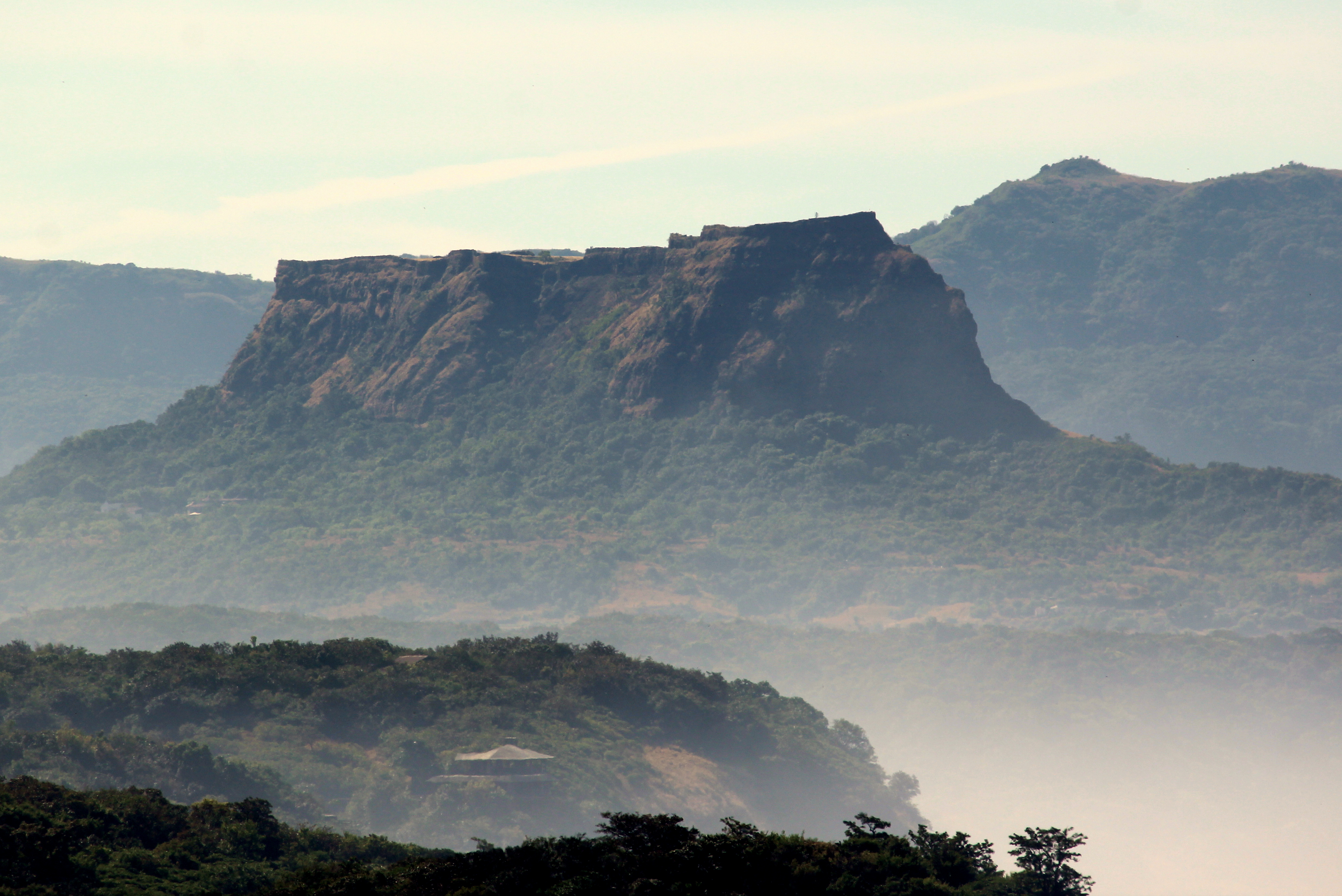
- Korigad hill fort as seen from Lonavala

Highest point
- Elevation: 923 m (3,028 ft)
- Coordinates: 18°37′13″N 73°23′08″E

Naming
- Language of name: Marathi

Geography
- Location within Maharashtra
- Location: Maharashtra, India
- Parent range: Western Ghats

Climbing
- Easiest route: Hike

Korigad (also called Koraigad, Koarigad or Kumwarigad) is a hill fort located about 18 km (11 mi) south of Lonavala in Pune district, Maharashtra, India. Its date of construction is not known but likely predates 1500. It is about 923 m above sea level. The planned township of Aamby Valley is built over the fort's southern and eastern foothills. The closest village is Peth Shahpur, about 1 km (0.62 mi) north of the fort.

== History ==
This fort was incorporated into his kingdom by the Maratha ruler Chatrapati Shivaji Maharaj along with the forts of Lohagad, Visapur, Tung and Tikona in 1657. On 11 March 1818, Colonel Prother tried to take over this fort but even after a prolonged siege could not make any headway. Finally on 14 March, by igniting the stored ammunition by means of a loose cannonball he succeeded and this fort went to the British.

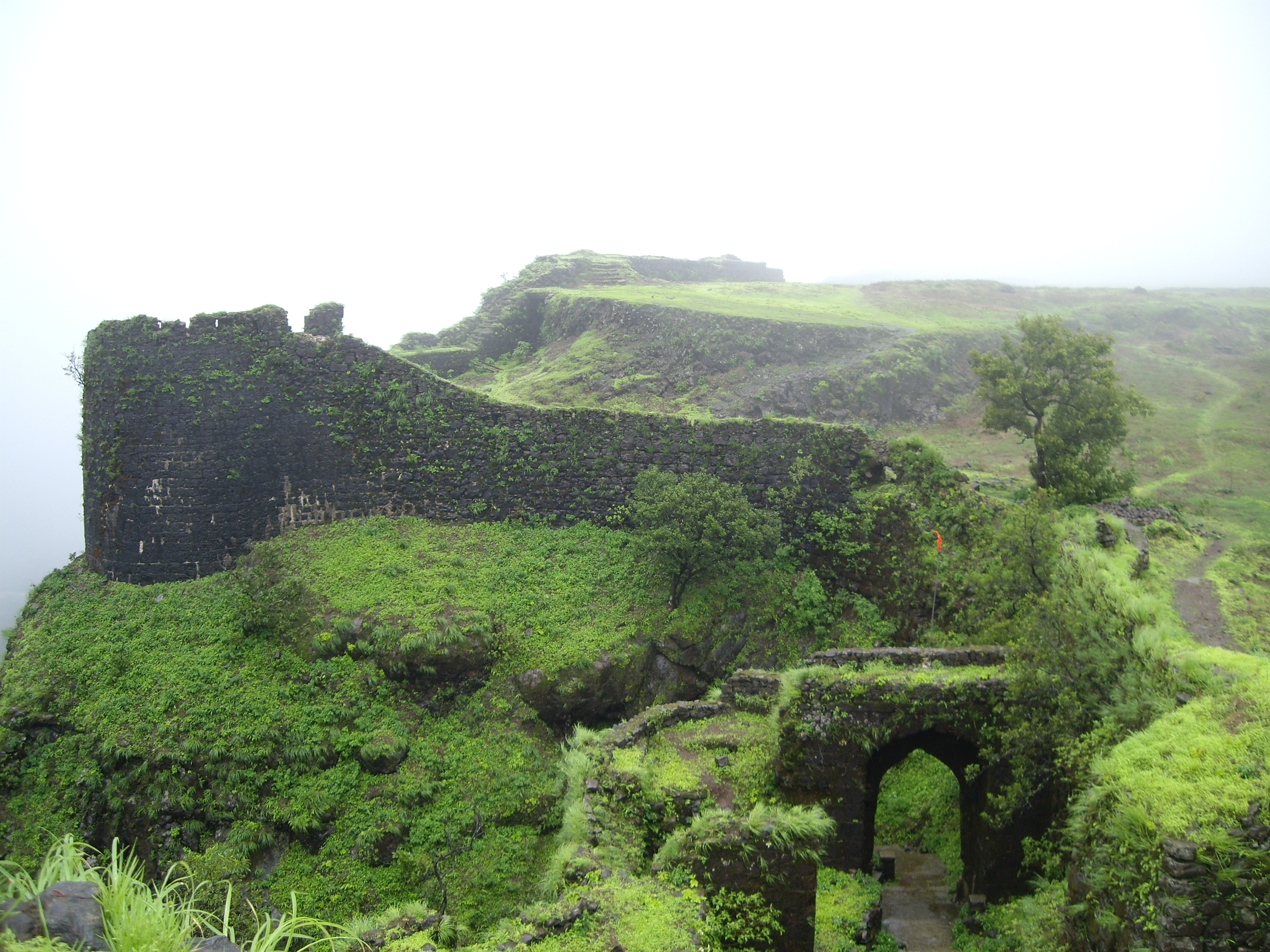
Korigad entrance and fort walls

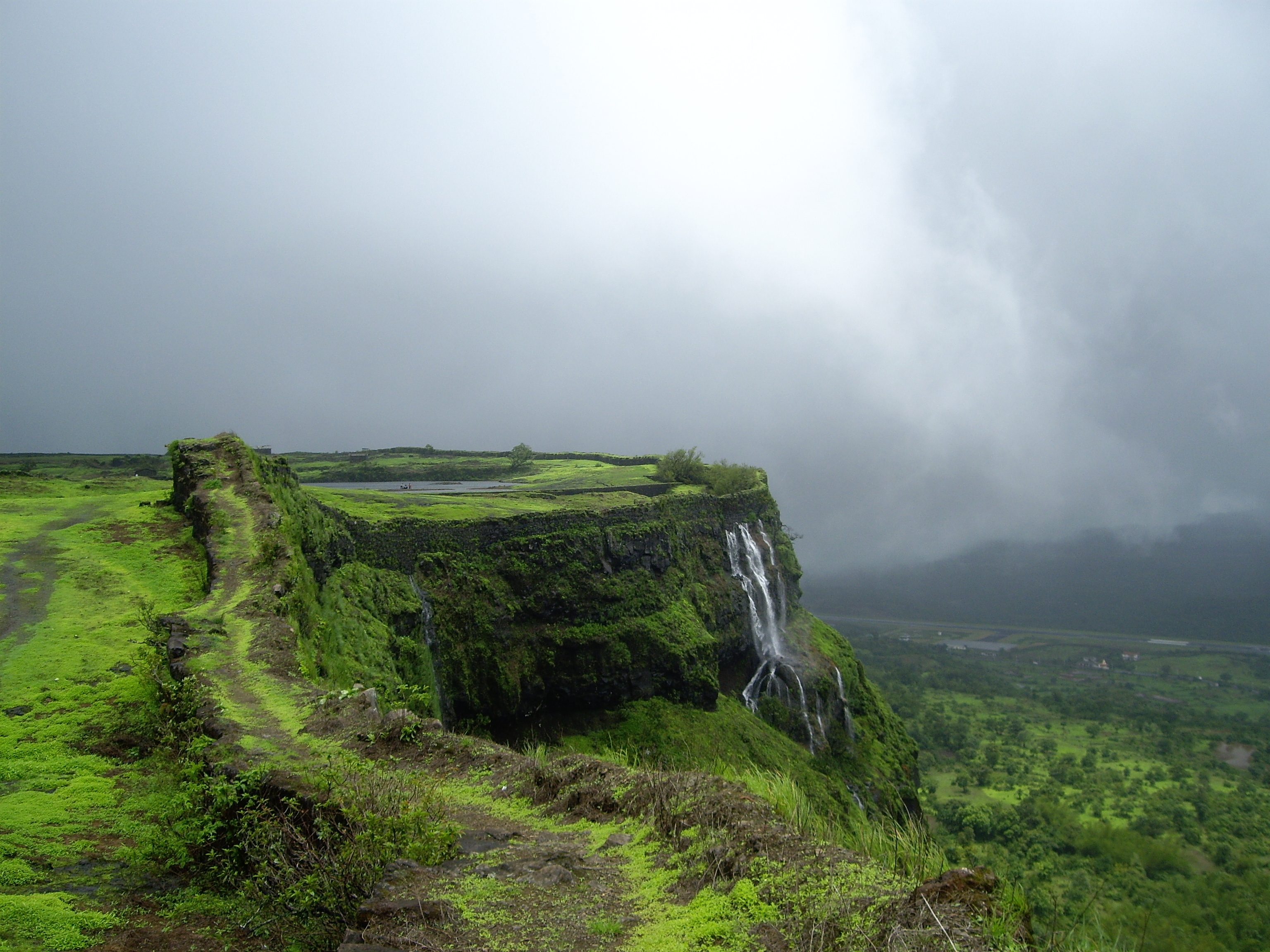
Korigad bastion

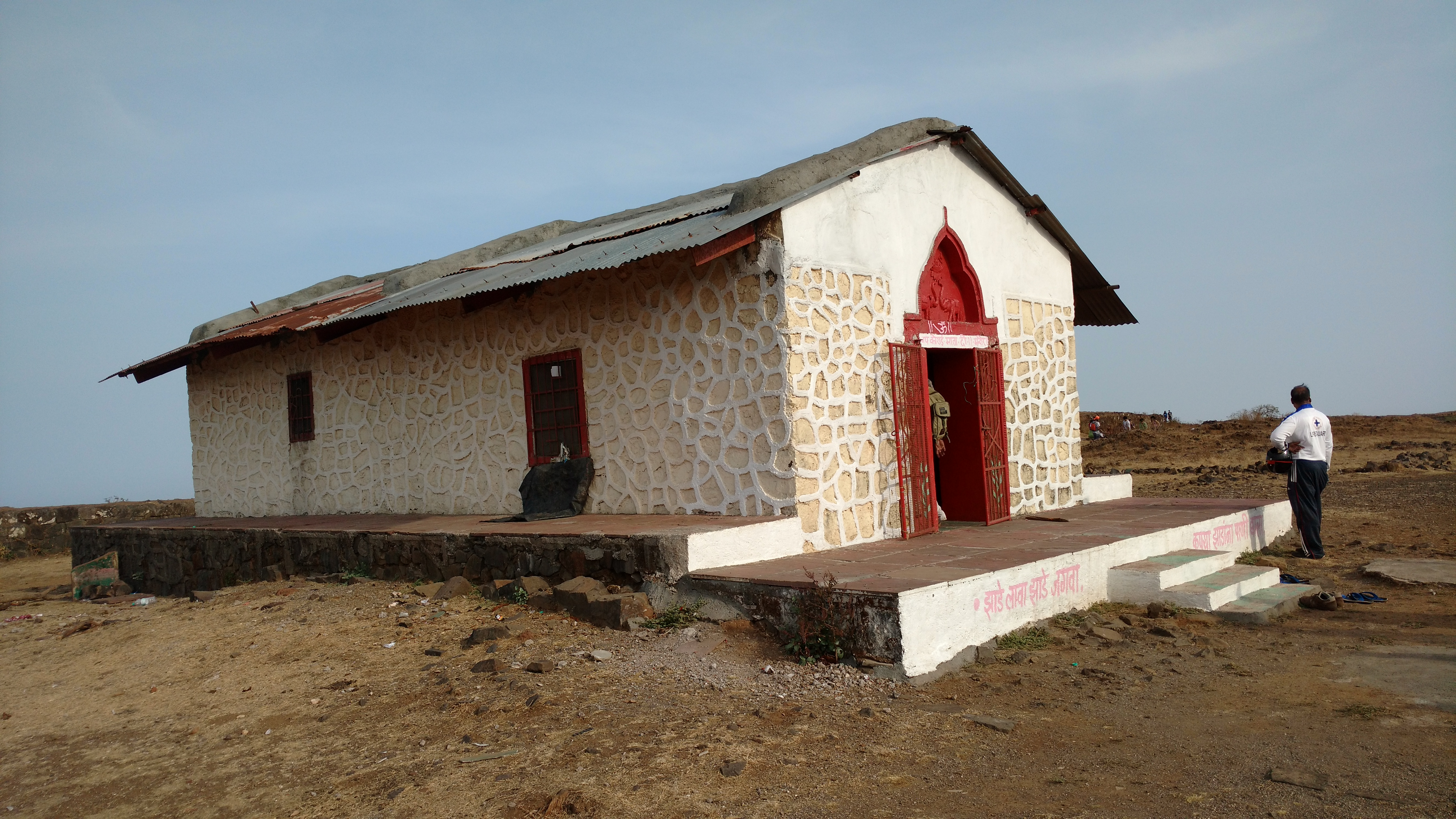
Koraidevi temple

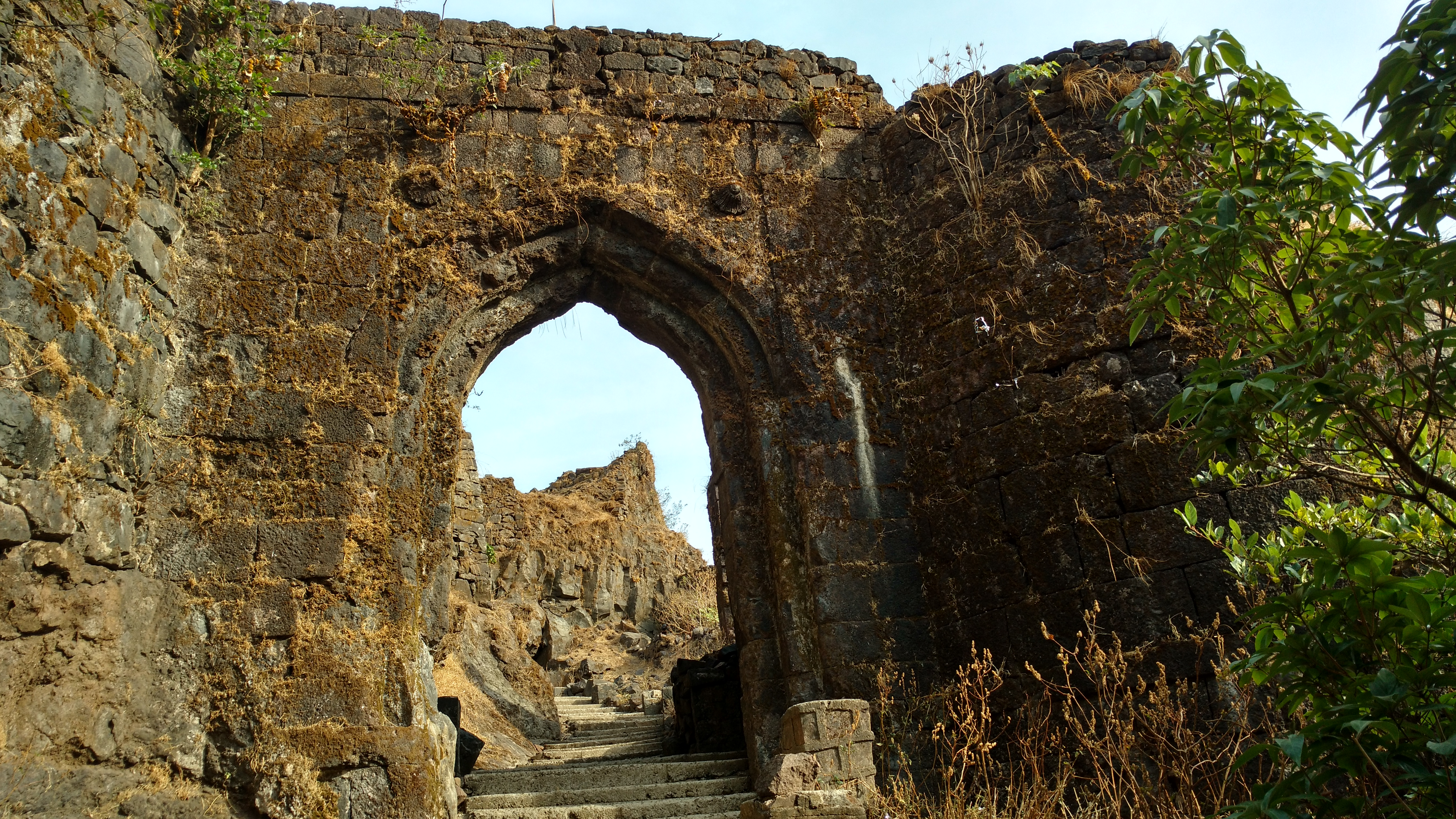
Entrance gate

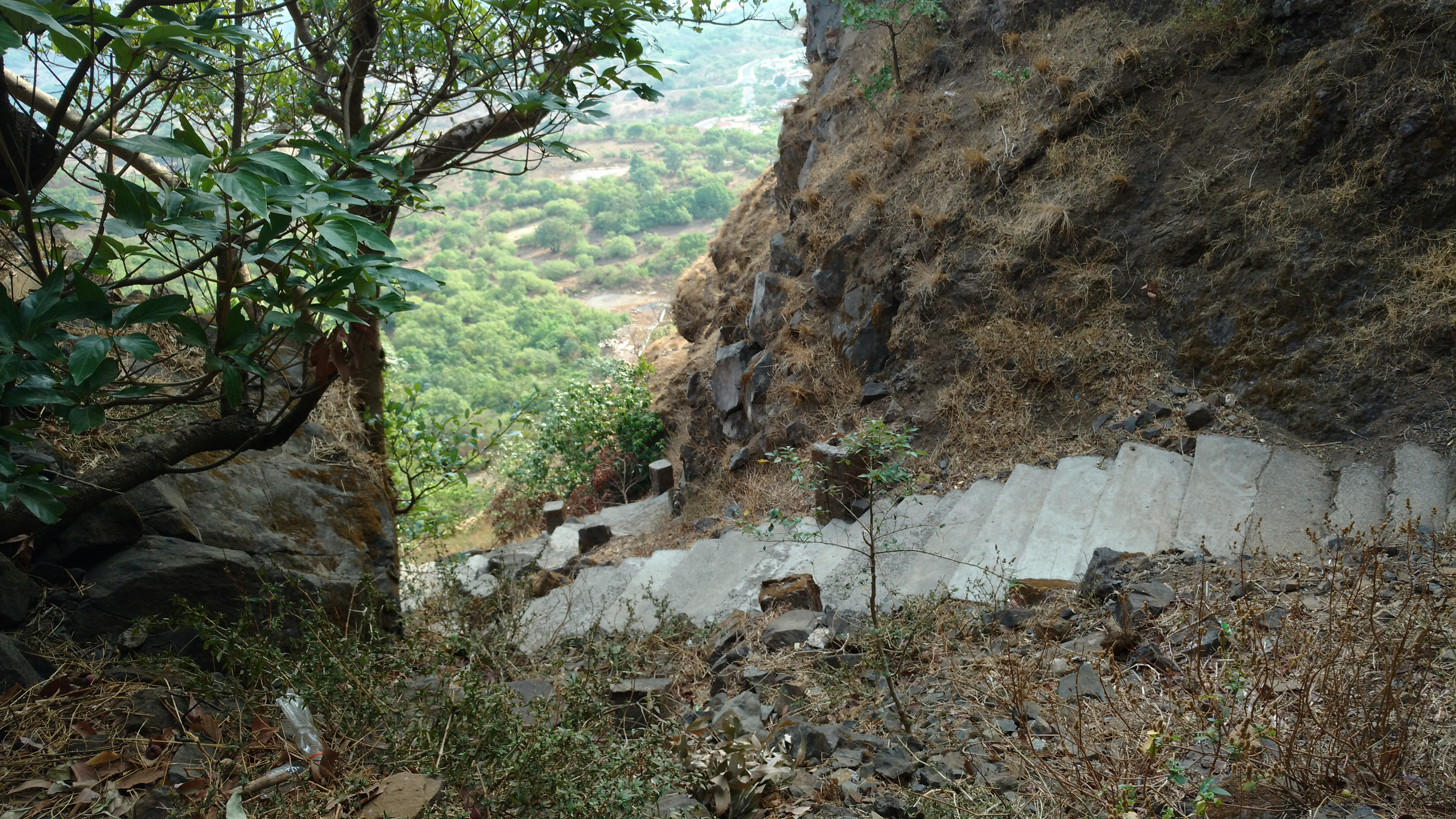
The steps

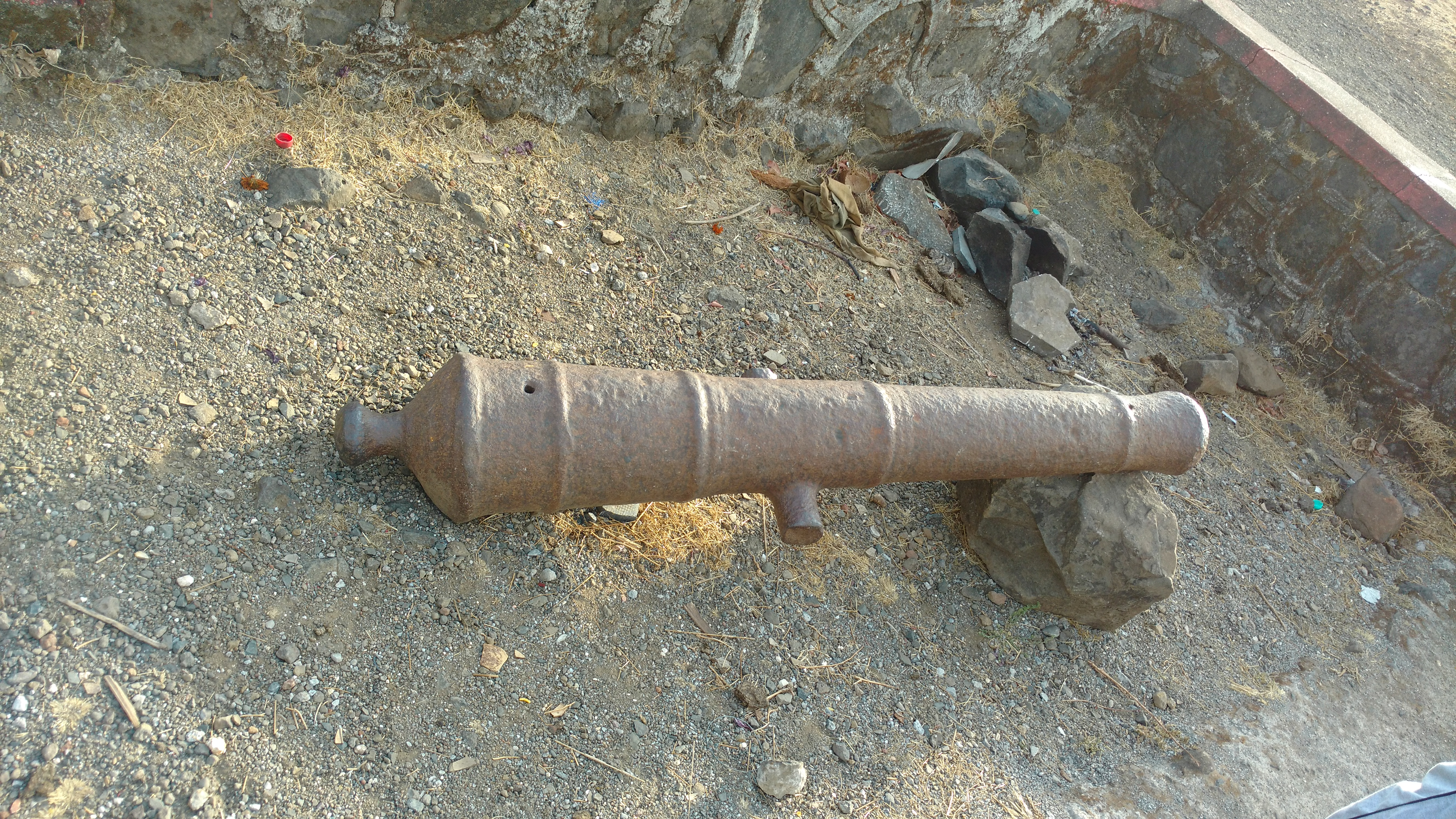
Cannon

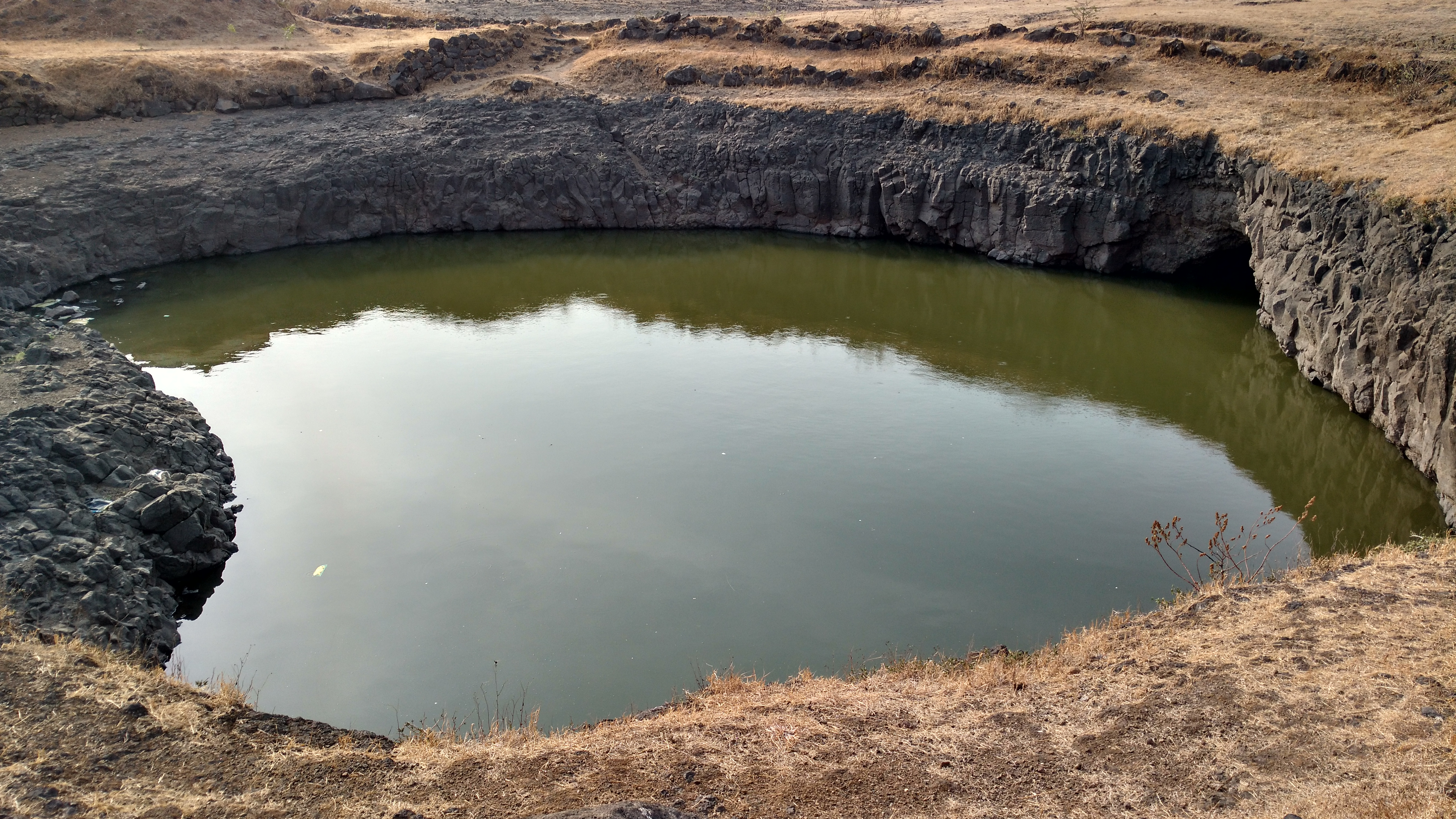
The pond on the fort

== Geography ==
The fort is located about 923 m (3,028 ft) above sea level, rising over 200 m (660 ft) higher than the neighboring valleys. To the east, there lie two artificial lakes part of the Aamby Valley project which later drain into the Mulshi reservoir. There are two lakes on the top of the fort.

== Structures on the Fort ==
A temple to its patron goddess Koraidevi also exists along with several smaller temples dedicated to Vishnu and Shiva. The former has been recently renovated and has a 3-foot-high Deepmala(tower of lamps). The interesting part of the fort is that its wall is completely intact and one can walk along its entire perimeter(about 2 km). Its massive gate is also intact. Several ruins of older structures within the fort still exist. It has six cannons - the largest of which called the Laxmi Toph is located near the Korai Devi temple.

== How to reach ==
Korigad is difficult to reach, without a car, as there are very few transportation options available from LonavalaThe route begins at Aamby Valley road from Lonavala, to Peth Shahpur village. Parking is available near the bus stop on the road. A 5-foot wide earthen road leads to the foot steps of the Korigad fort with an easy climb up to the fort. This fort can be visited in any time of the year including at night. There are many camping sites at the fort as well as three temples to provide cover. The Korai Devi temple can accommodate 25 persons.
