= Malhargad =

Fort in Pune district, India

Coordinates: 18°24′44″N 74°2′56″E

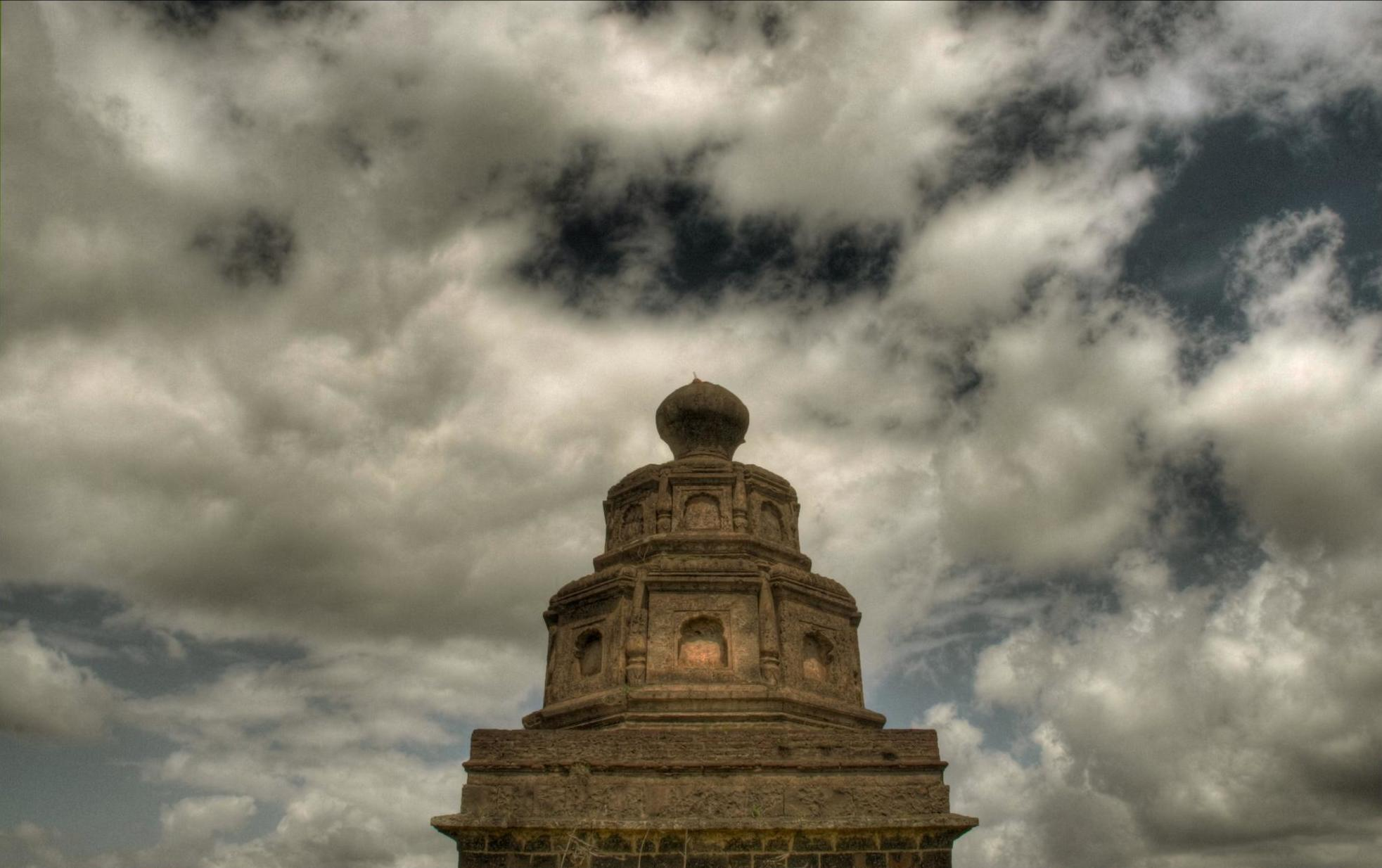
Detail on temple roof, Malhargad

Malhargad is a hill fort in western India near Saswad, 30 kilometres (19 mi) from Pune. It is also known as Sonori Fort due to the village of Sonori being situated at its base. The fort was named for the god Malhari and was the last fort built by the Marathas, in 1775.

The Sahyadri range to the west of Pune in Velha taluka is split, and the forts Rajgad and Torna are on one branch while Forts Sinhagad, Purandar, Vajragad and Malhargad on the other. This range is known as the Bhuleshwar range which is spread along the east–west direction. The fort is believed to be built to keep watch on Dive ghat along the Pune-Saswad route. The fort was built by Bhivrâo Yashvant and Krishnaji Mâdhavrâo Pânsê, a Peshwa Sardar, who was the chief in charge of Tofkhana of the Peshwas. Citations of a visit of Elder Madhavrao Peshwe to the fort are available in historic documents. A palace, belonging to Panse, can be seen in the Sonori village though much of it is in ruins.

The fort is in good condition. There are two temples constructed side-by-side: the smaller for Lord Khandoba, and the larger for Lord Mahadeva. From the top of this fort, the city of Jejuri and Parvati Hills can be seen.

== See also ==
- List of forts in India
- List of forts in Maharashtra
