= Tung Fort =

Hill fort in Maharashtra, India

- Kathingad
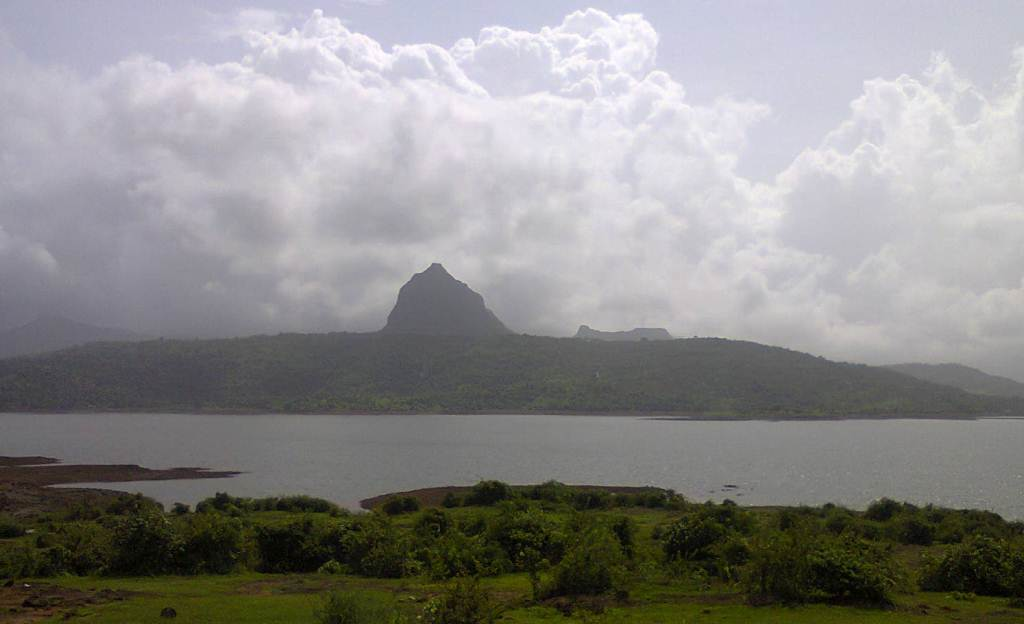
- View of Tung Fort

Highest point
- Elevation: 1,075 m (3,527 ft)
- Coordinates: 18°39′37″N 73°27′47″E

Naming
- English translation: Difficult Fort
- Language of name: Marathi

Geography
- Location within Maharashtra
- Location: Maharashtra, India
- Parent range: Western Ghats

Climbing
- Easiest route: Hike

Tung Fort (or Kathingad; difficult fort in Marathi) is a hill fort in Pune District, India.

== Location ==
It is about 12 km from Malavli railway station and can also be approached from Lonavala. Tung Fort has an elevation of 1075 m above sea level. Since Pawna was built, it is now surrounded by water on three sides. One can ferry across in a boat from Pawna dam to its base village, Tungi.

Tung fort is also named Kathingad fort. The word "Kathin" in Marathi means difficult. While climbing, one can experience the difficult challenge of reaching this fort. The fort is conical and has steep climbs with a very narrow route on the edge of the mountain throughout. From Pawana dam, reaching this fort requires a 400-metre climb.

From Lonavala, one can reach the base village Tungwadi around 20 km via Bushy Dam-INS Shivaji-Peth Shahapur-Tungwadi. From Tungwadi village, reaching this fort requires about a 300-metre climb.

== History ==
Tung Fort was built before 1600 CE. It was built by the Adil Shahi dynasty but was captured by Chatrapati Shivaji Maharaj. It is a small fort, and able to hold not more than 200 troops at a time. As such, it would not have been able to defend itself on its own for a long time. Its shape and structure suggest that its main function was as a watchtower overlooking Maval region of the Pawana and Mulshi valleys guarding the road to Pune city. The Dhamale family, one of the Deshmukh from the Maval region, was charged with ensuring the security of Tung Fort. During invasion, it served to provide a temporary distraction for invaders. Thus, the major forts of Visapur and Lohagad would have time to prepare themselves to meet the invading army.

== Major features ==
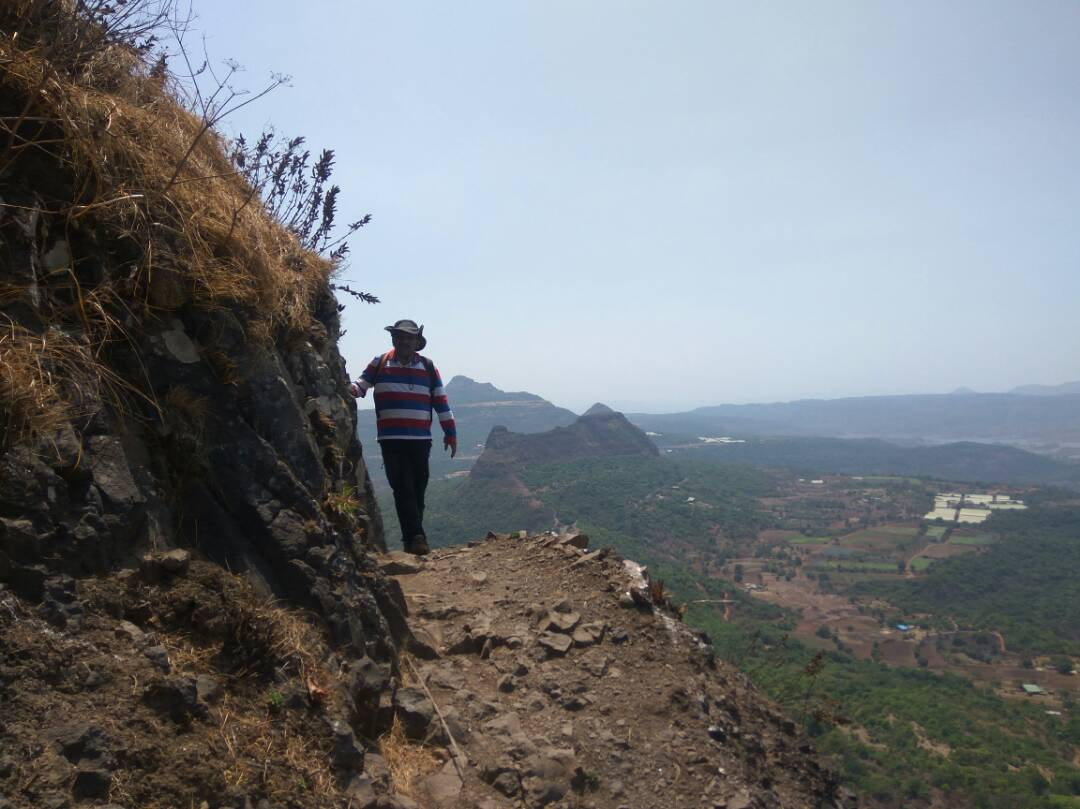
Narrow pathway to the fort

Its sharp, conical peak makes Tung Fort a prominent landmark, even from a distance. It has an oval shape, thick walls and numerous bastions. A steep climb on grassy slopes leads to the ruins of a temple at the summit. A rocky staircase leads several feet down to a water reservoir. From the top of the fort, the Lohagad, Visapur, Tikona and Korigad forts are clearly visible.

== Gallery ==
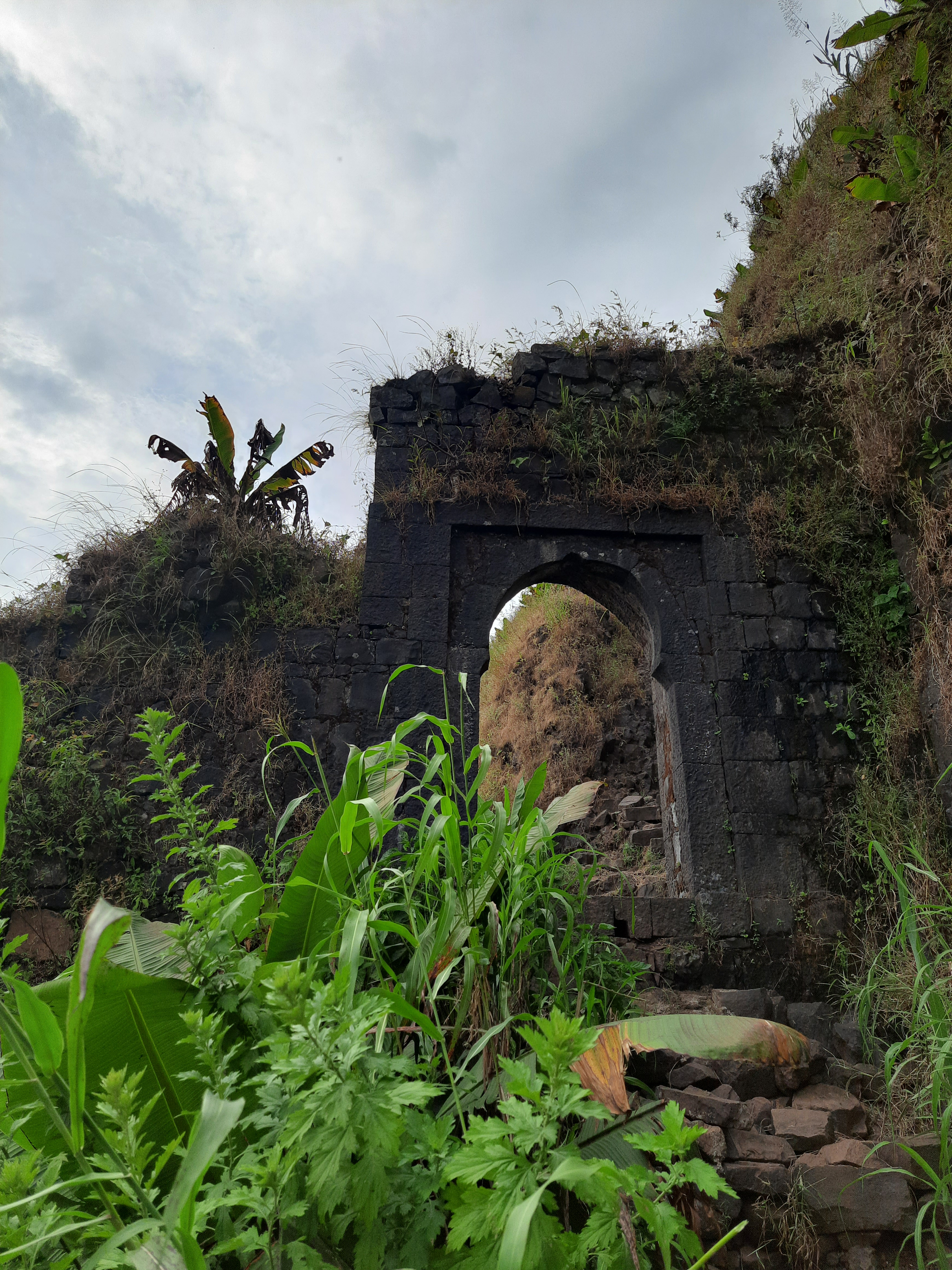
Entrance door

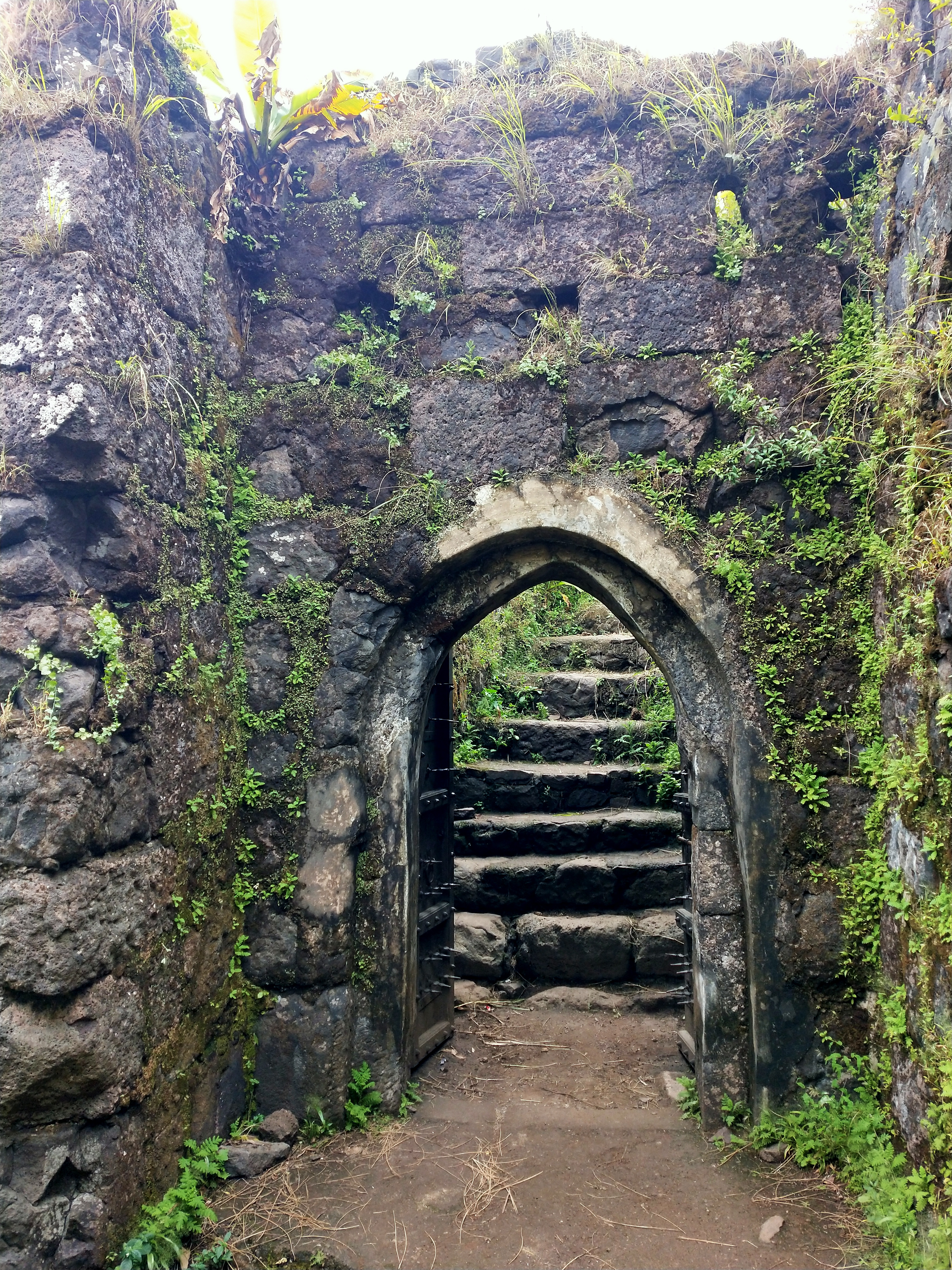
Secondary door

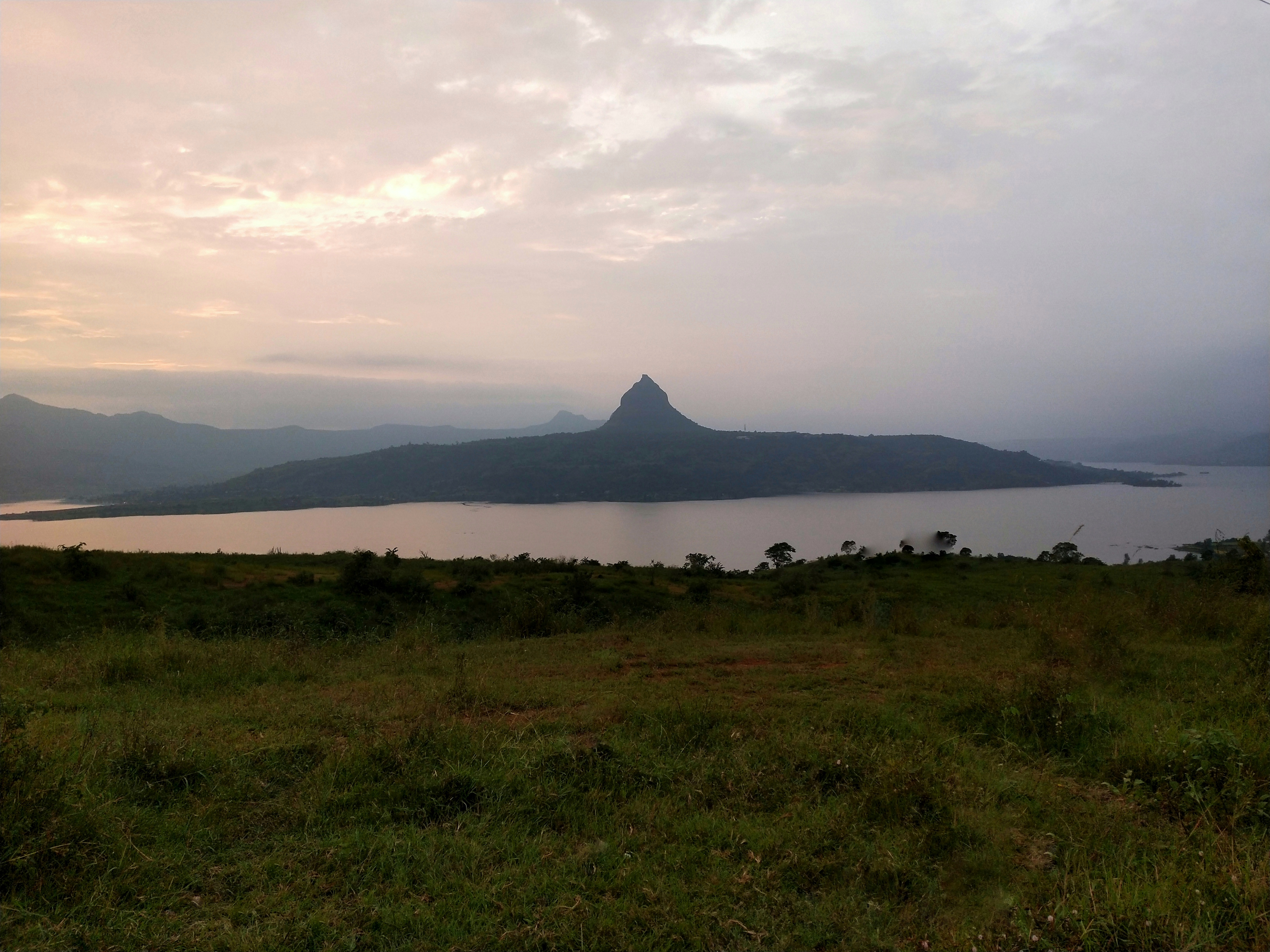
Tung fort mountain view

== See also ==
- List of forts in Maharashtra

=== Nearest forts ===
- Tikona fort
- Korigad
- Lohagad
- Visapur fort
- Rajmachi fort

=== Nearest caves ===
- Bedse caves
- Bhaja caves
- Karla caves
- Kondana caves
