= Chhatrapati Shivaji Maharaj Museum of Indian History =

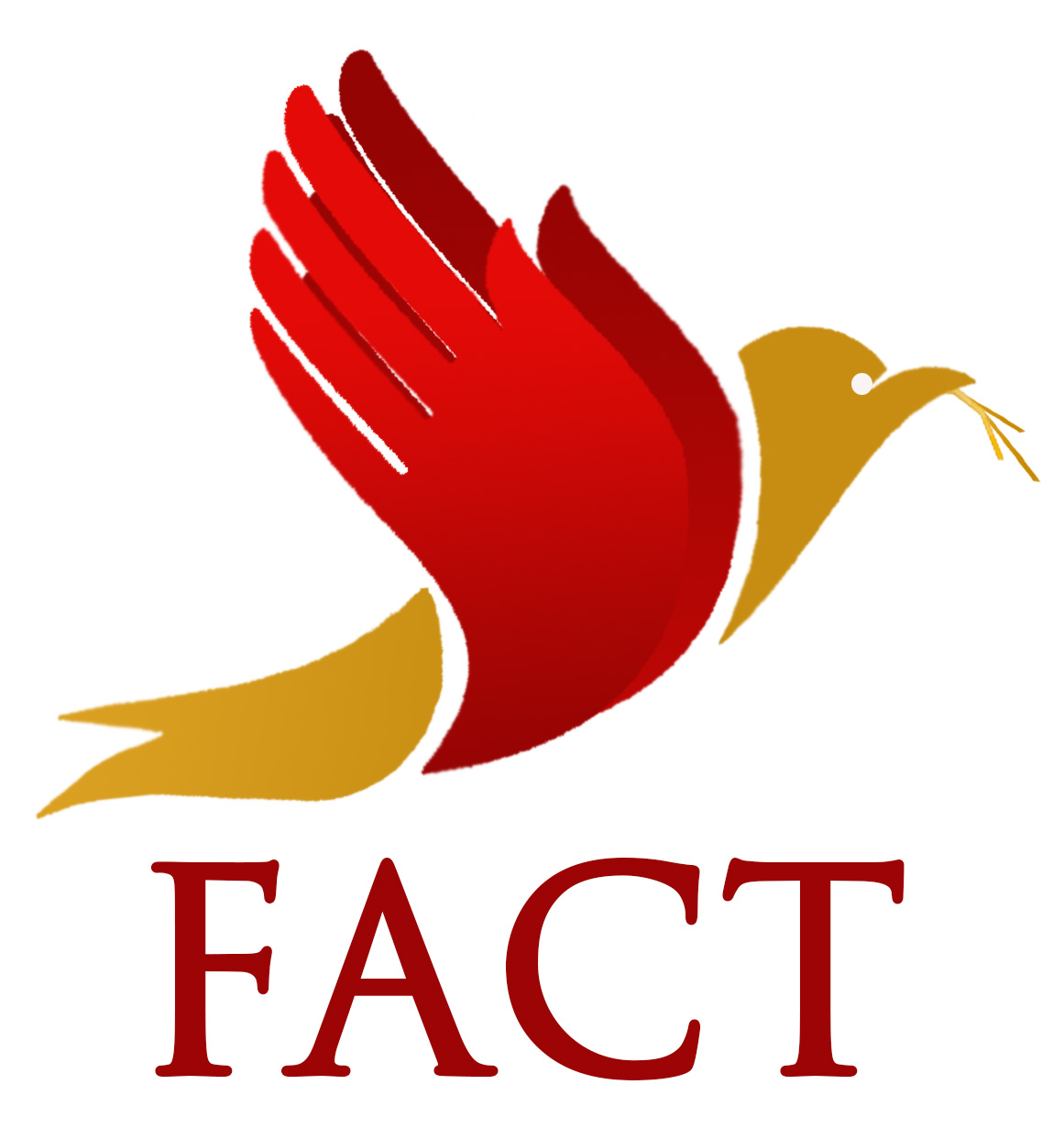
- FACT logo

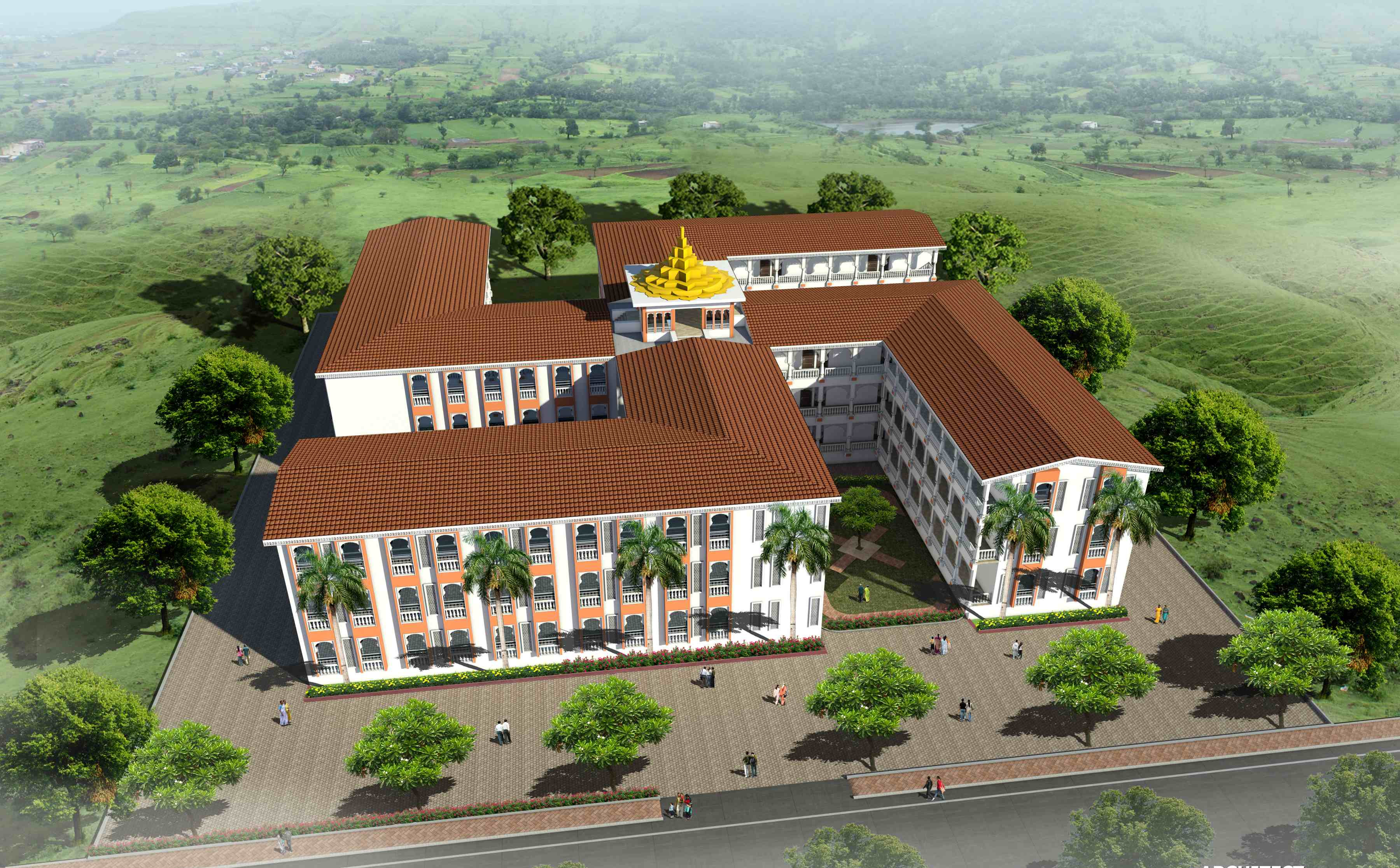
- Prospective plan of the museum

- Location within Maharashtra
- Established: 14 January 2012
- Location: Wadgaon Shinde Rd, Gulabhari Vasti, Pune district, Maharashtra
- Coordinates: 18.6161241°N 73.9418829°E
- Type: Historical Museum
- Owner: FACT
- Parking: On site (no charge)
- Website: www.factmuseum.com

Chhatrapati Shivaji Maharaj Museum of Indian History (CSMMIH) is a private historical museum founded by François Gautier in 2012 under the banner of his not-for-profit organization, the Foundation For Advancement of Cultural Ties (FACT). The first phase the museum was inaugurated by Ravi Shankar and endorsed by Ajit Pawar and Nitin Gadkari. In addition to various exhibits the museum also has a freely accessible digital library on their website that has hundreds of books on Indian history and culture.

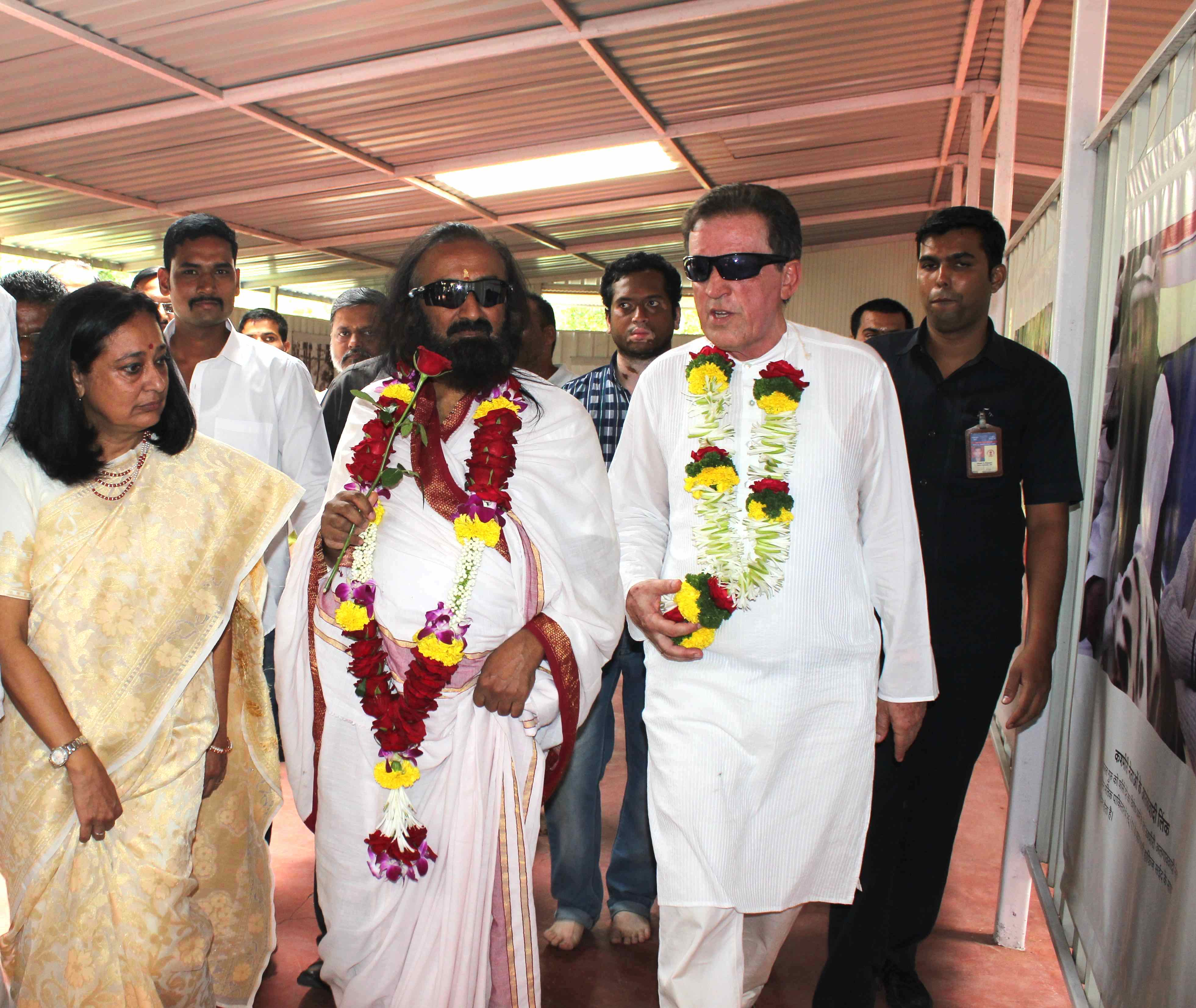
Ravi Shankar with Francois Gautier at the inauguration of the museum

== Layout ==
The museum complex has twenty two buildings, each housing a unique exhibition. Among them are displays regarding Aurangzeb, based on his own firmans, on Maharana Pratap, the only Rajput to fight the Mughals and win; Dara Shikoh, two exhibitions on the great Chhatrapati Shivaji Maharaj, as well numerous exhibitions on women warriors, like Alyabhai Holkar, Tarabai of Maharashtra, Rani Kittur Chennama of Karnataka. Francois Gautier also wanted to highlight the suffering of Hindus throughout the ages, thus there are exhibitions on the Portuguese Inquisition, Tippu Sultan, the Hindu Holocaust. The museum complex also has one of the two temples in India dedicated to Bharat Mata (Mother India). The architect of the Bharat Mata temple and the future Museum is MRS Sheetal Harpale of Pune.

The museum houses a series of exhibitions, for example, a miniature painting exhibition on the life of Shivaji, a 17th-century Indian king; an exhibition on Hindu tolerance throughout the ages; and another exhibition that "scientifically refutes the Aryan invasion theory".

In July 2013, the 14th Dalai Lama inaugurated a Tibetan pavilion showcasing an exhibition of text and pictures on the travails of people from Tibet over the last 60 years. An open exhibition on Dara Shikoh, was also inaugurated by Uddhav Thackeray.

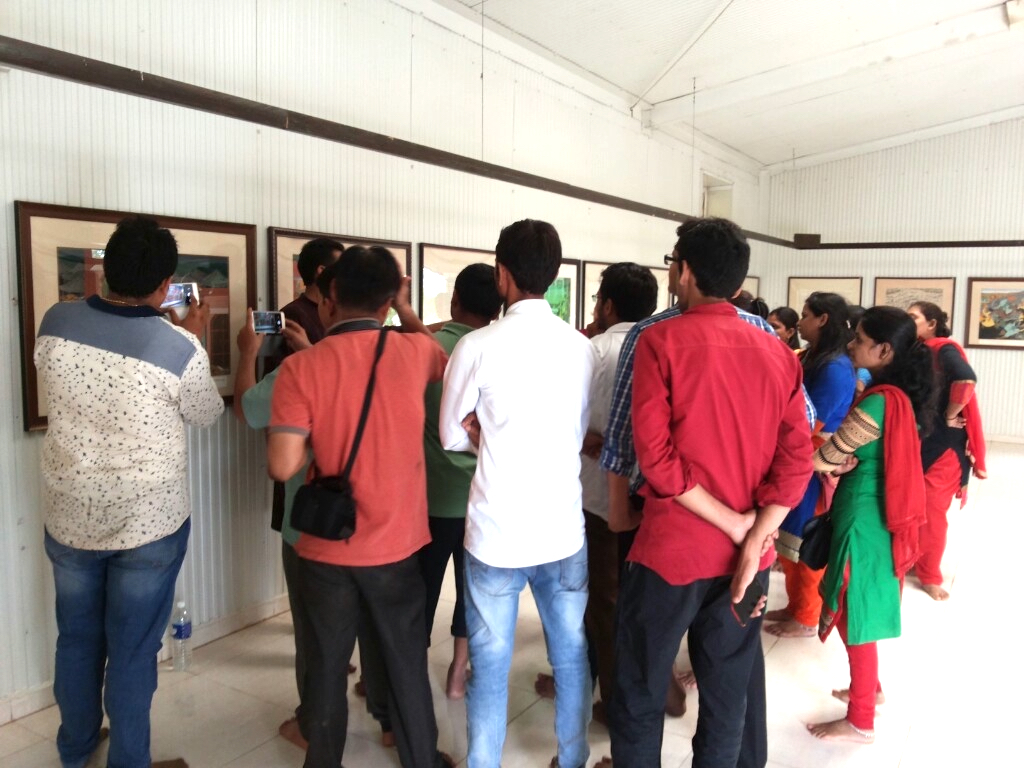
People appreciating the exhibits at Shivaji Hall, CSMMIH Museum

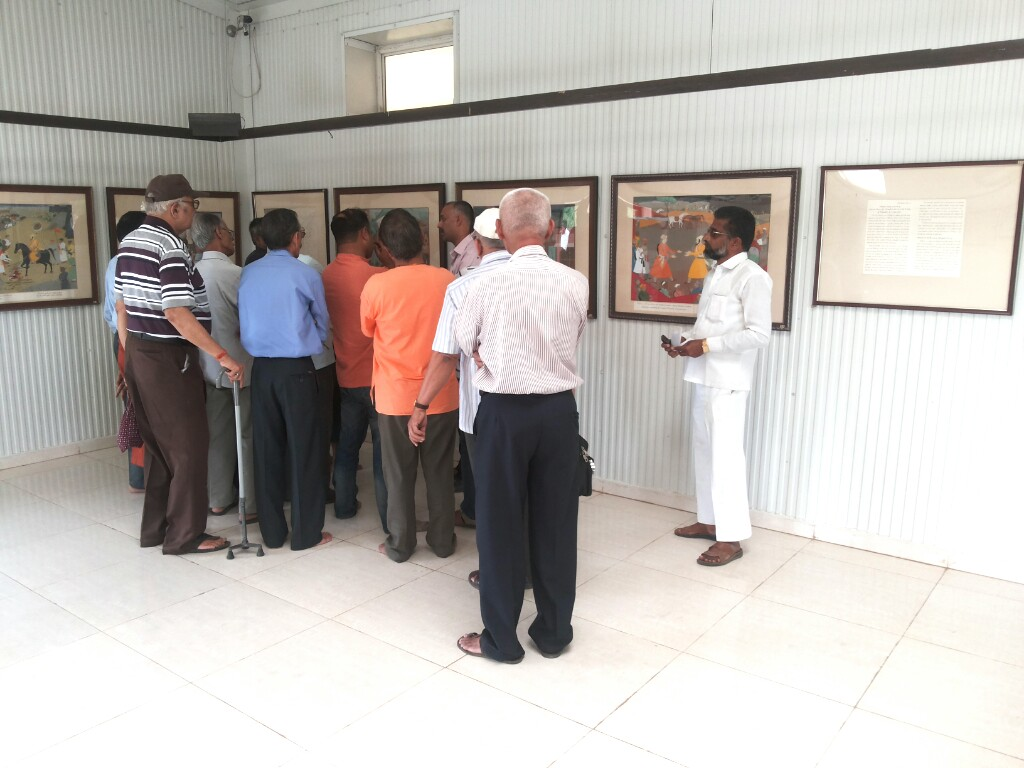
People appreciating the exhibits at CSMMIH Museum

The museum is open daily with free entrance. In 2022, it received 15,000 visitors, many of them school children. The future museum is proposed to cost about 17 crore rupees spread across an area of 100,000 square feet and will house 70 exhibitions with state of the art research and archival facilities. It will be in the shape of Swastika, an auspicious symbol in many Indic religions. It is scheduled to open in 2018.

== Exhibits and exhibitions ==
Exhibition	Year
Permanent Exhibitions at CSMMIH Museum
Kashmiri Pandit Pavilion	January 2015
Bangladesh minorities exhibition	February 2015
Portuguese Inquisition exhibition The first of its kind in the world, showing how the Inquisition tortured and killed, not only Hindus, but also Muslims and Jews in Goa.	September 2016
Tipu Sultan exhibition	December 2016
Moving or Temporary exhibitions at various places
Sikhs: The defenders of Indian Dharma Inaugurated by Sri Sri Ravi Shankar from 22 January - 7 February 2008 at Bangla Sahib Gurudwara, New Delhi. Visitors: 65,000.	January 2008
Naxalism: Threat to Unified Nation of India First shown in Oslo, Norway, then in Delhi’s Habitat Centre.	
Exhibition on persecution of Minorities in Bangladesh A traveling exhibition, all over India, including interior villages of Maharashtra, Karnataka, Goa. A total of 250,000 visitors attended the exhibition.	
Aurangzeb: as he was according to the Moghul records The exhibition gathered much controversy in Chennai and was locked up but was soon brought out and will be traveling to Mumbai and Ahmedabad soon after being screened in Delhi (in March 2007), Pune (October 2007) and Chennai (March 2008). Till date 56,000 people visited the exhibition and has received a record critical acclaim from critics and common visitors.	
A Hero for Modern India: Chhatrapati Shivaji Maharaj The exhibition was centered around Shivaji, a 17th-century Indian king who fought with Mughals. The Bangalore leg of the exhibition has had the Chief Minister of the state asking to exhibit it in various schools and colleges in Karnataka.	March 2008
Terror Unleashed, An Exhibition on Kashmir A traveling exhibition to Delhi, Bangalore, Mumbai, Pune, Poland, Germany, Israel, England, Holland, Scotland, Interior villages in Maharashtra and the US Congress. As on date, 300,000 visitors have appreciated the exhibition.	
Ahilyabai Holkar the warrior queen An exhibition on Ahilyabai Holkar screened in January 2010 in Pune, Indore and later Mumbai. She's often regarded as the Warrior Queen who rebuilt the Indian spiritual centers across the country.	
Maharana Pratap the indomitable. The only Rajput who fought the Mughals and actually beat Akbar’s army in Haldighat. Portrays his simple life with his soldiers and how he respected his enemies’ women and children, cared for his subjects and encouraged arts.	
Dara Shukoh the Sufi Shah Jahan’s eldest (and heir apparent), a true Muslim, a Sufi and scholar translated the Upanishads and studied other religions. Chronicles the beheading of him by Aurangzeb to usurp the Mughal throne.	July 2013
The History of Tibet The beautiful history of Tibet and the struggle of its people since they were invaded by the Chinese in 1959	July 2013
The Aryan Invasion that never was Exhibition for 'scientifically proving' that the Aryan invasion theory which is taken as the foundation of Indian history, never happened and as the exhibition claims is still used by politicians and missionaries.	

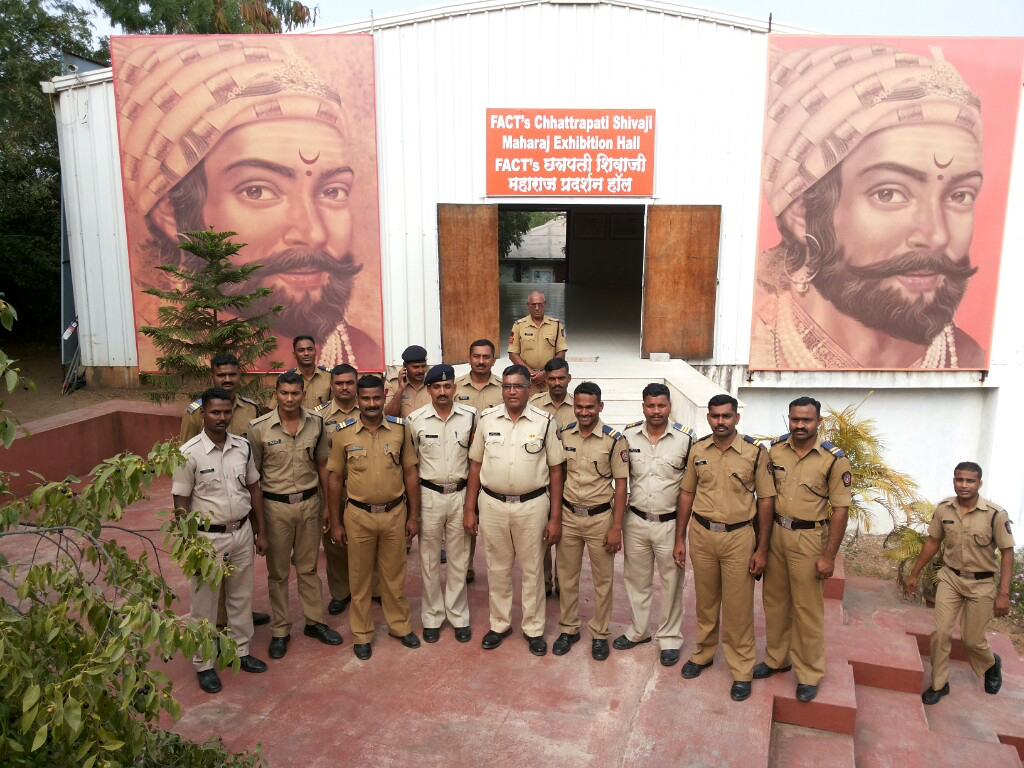
Law enforcement officials standing in front of the Shivaji Hall

== Videos and documentaries produced by the museum ==
The museum has produced the following videos and documentaries:

- Christian conversions
- Kashmiri Pandits
- Brahmins and Upper castes
- The Trauma of Partition
- Mumbai train blasts
- 26/11, The true story
- Biopic of Shivaji Maharaj
- The legend of Lachit Borpukan

== See also ==
- Ahilyabai Holkar
- Chhatrapati Shivaji Maharaj Vastu Sangrahalaya
- Indian Museum
