= Tikona =

Fort in Pune district, Maharashtra, India

- Maval
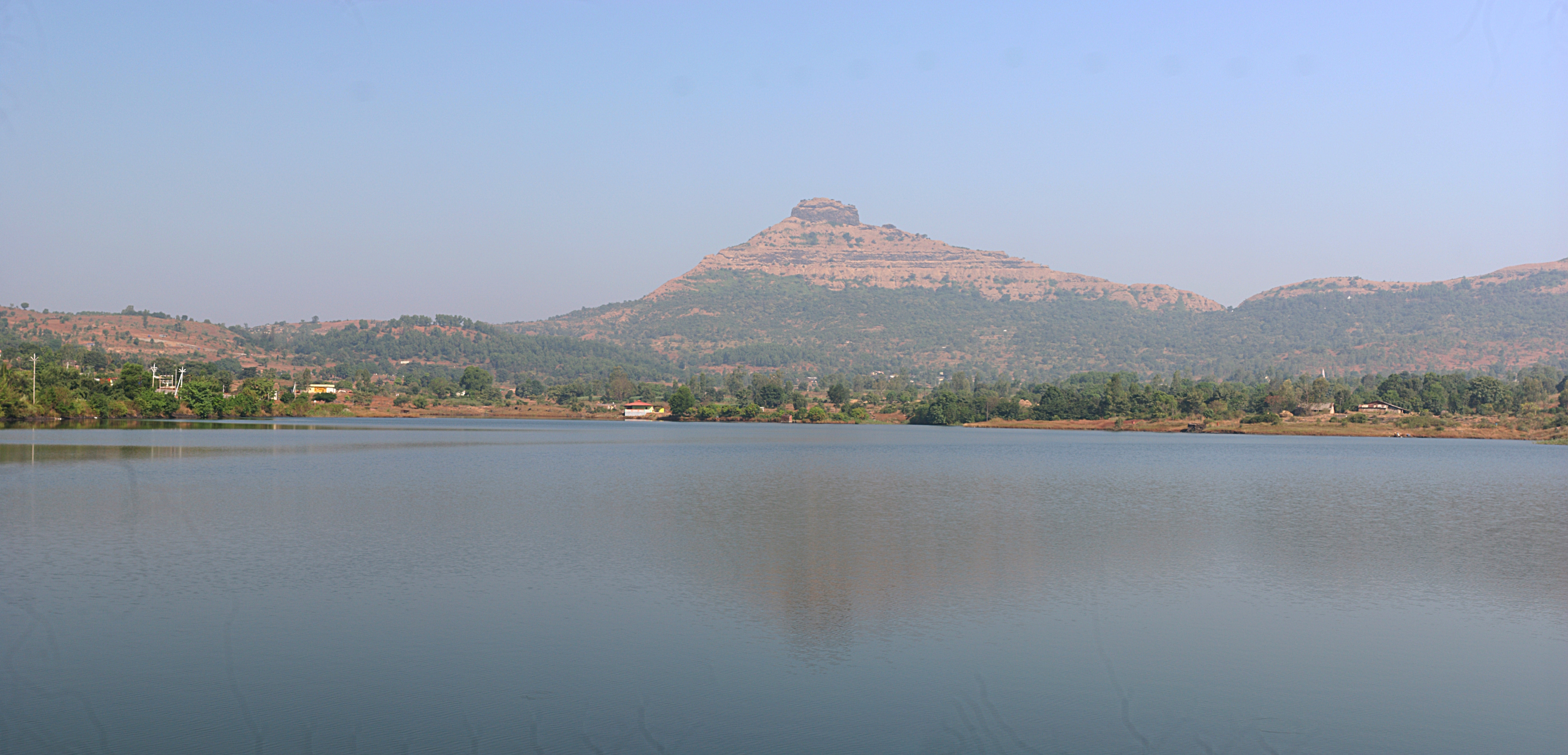
- Tikona Fort near Pawna reservoir.

Site information
- Type: Fortress
- Owner: Govt. of India
- Open to the public: Yes
- Condition: Ruined

Location
- Coordinates: 18.6317°N 73.5128°E
- Height: 3580ft

Site history
- Materials: Stone and mortar

Tikona also known as Vitandgad, is the dominant hill fort in Maval in western India. It is located near Kamshet around 60 km from Pune. The village nearest to the fort is called Tikona-Peth. The 3500 foot high hill is pyramidal in shape and the name Tikona means "triangular".

The fort is a trekking destination noted for the large doors, the temple of 'Trimbakeshwar Mahadev', seven water tanks (seven water tanks), and some Satvahan caves. Trek organisers also commend the views of Pavana dam and the nearby forts of Tung, Lohagad and Visapur. There is a good view of Pavana lake from the summit.

== History ==
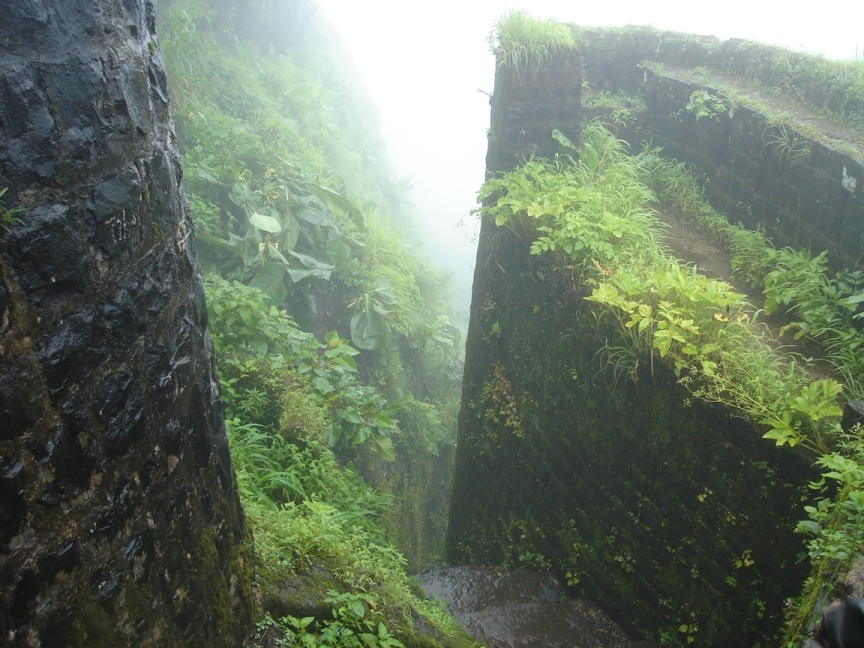
Steps leading up to the ramparts of the fort.

Little is known about the origins of this fort. There is a vihara on the fort datable to circa seventh-eight centuries A.D. Malik Ahmad Nizam Shah I of the Nizam Shahi dynasty conquered the fort in 1585 and annexed it to the Nizam territory. In 1657, Chhatrapati Shivaji Maharaj brought the whole of Konkan, which had been Nizam territory, under his control when he conquered Tikona along with the forts of Karnala, Lohagad, Mahuli, Songad, Tala, and Visapur. This fort was a strategic nexus: the centre of control for the entire Pawana Mawal region. In 1660, Dhamale family, the Deshmukhs from Maval region were charged with ensuring the security of fort Tikona. It was under the Dhamale Deshmukh family for a long time. Jaysingh invaded the region in 1665 and attacked the local villages but the forts held out. Tikona fort was surrendered to the Mughal warrior Kubadkhan, who had attacked the region together with Halal Khan and others, according to the Treaty of Purandar signed on 12 June 1665. Kubad Khan took over the fort on 18 June but it was later recaptured by the Marathas. In 1682 King Sambhaji met Aurangzeb's son Akbar. After the meeting, Akbar was offered to stay on Tikona fort, however, he was shifted to Jaitapur as the climate didn't suit him. A small battle was fought by the Maratha army with the British in 1818 before it was captured by the latter.

== How to reach ==
The nearest town is Kamshet which is 51km from Pune. The base village of the fort is Tikona peth which is 26 km from Kamshet. There are good hotels at Kamshet, now tea and snacks are also available in small hotels at Tikonapeth and Kale colony. The trekking path starts from the hillock south of the parking area near Tikonapeth. The route is very safe and wide. There are few trees on the trekking route. It takes about an hour to reach the entrance gate of the fort. There are very steep and high, which makes the climb a thrilling experience. There is very little space in the fort. It is advisable not to accompany large groups for climbing the fort. The steps are so narrow that only a single person can climb at a time. The night stay on the fort can be made in the caves either near the entrance of the fort or on the top of the fort. The villagers from the local fort restoration committee in the Tikonapeth make night stay and food arrangements at a reasonable cost. The Bedse caves which are on the way from Kamshet can also be visited on the way to Tikona on the same day

== Gallery ==
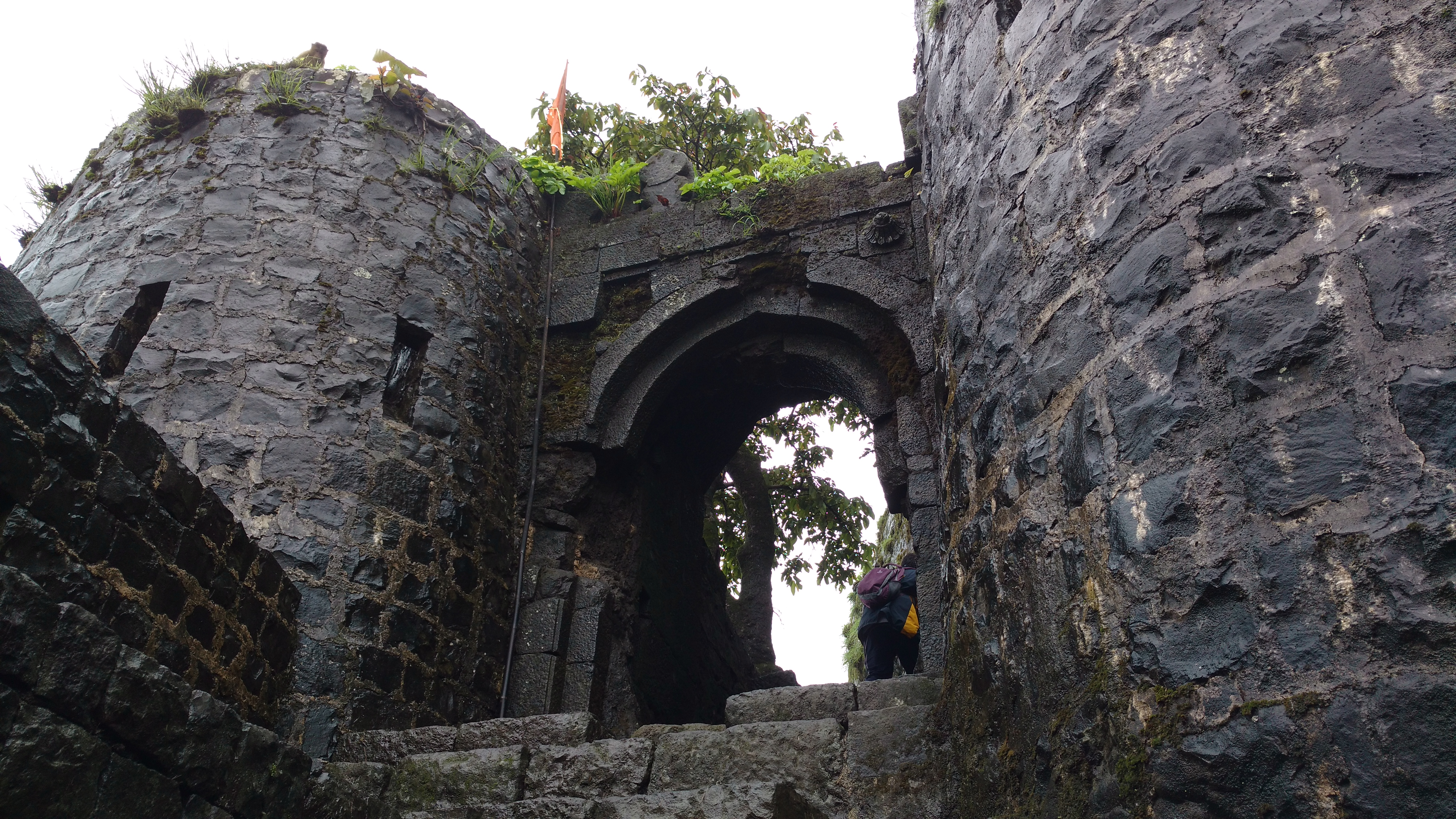
Main gate of the Fort

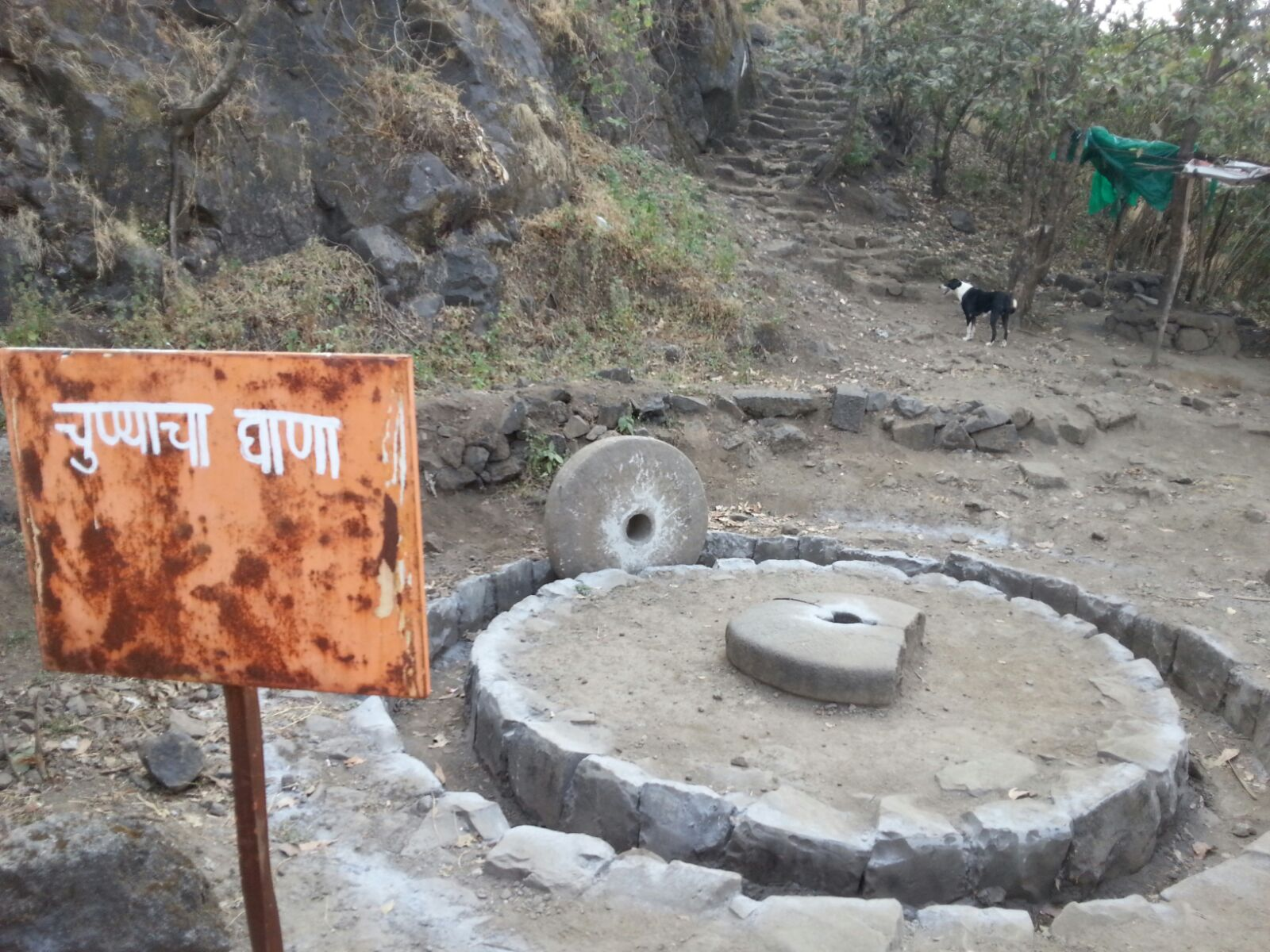
Limestone Crusher

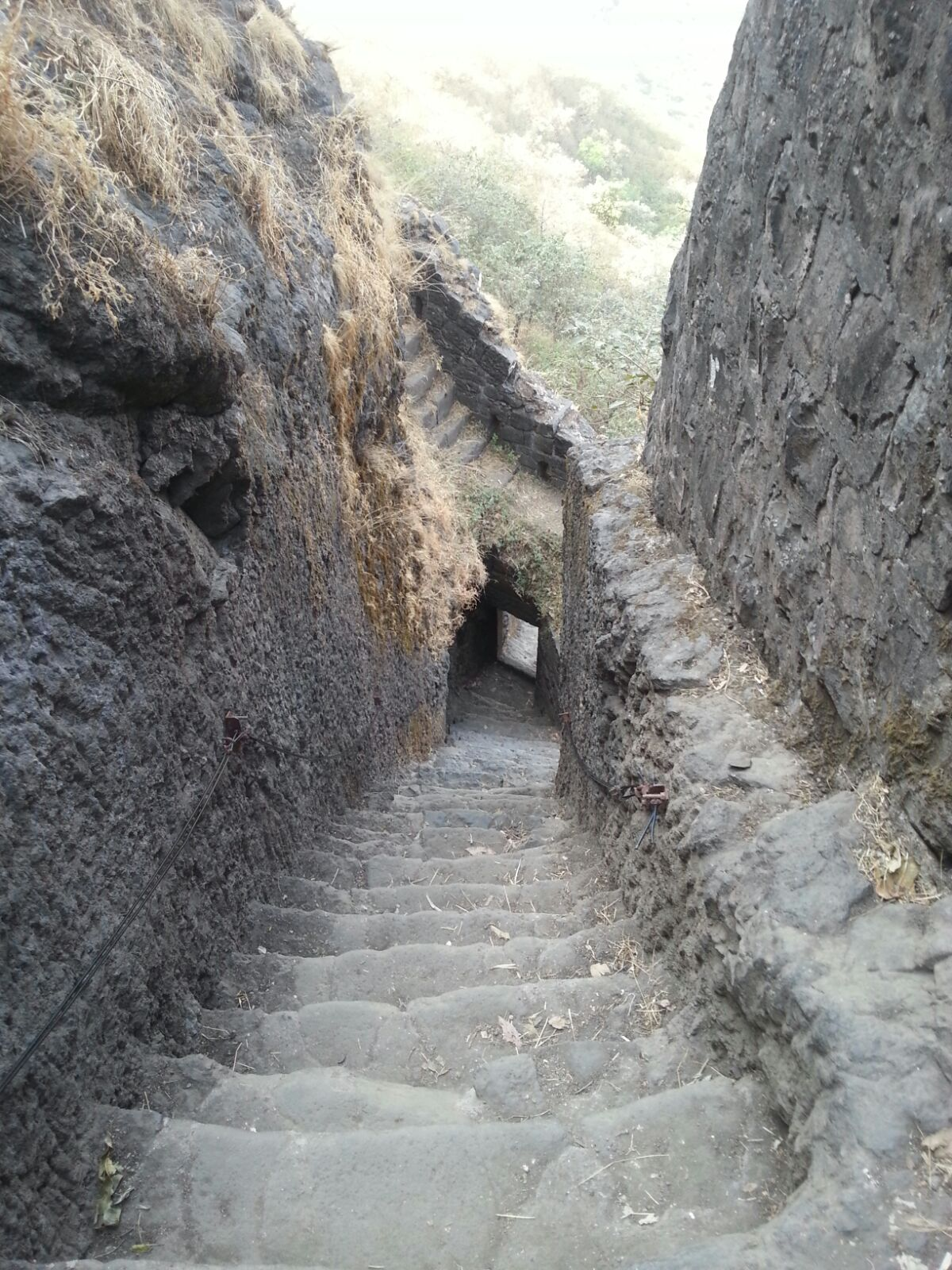
Rock cut steps

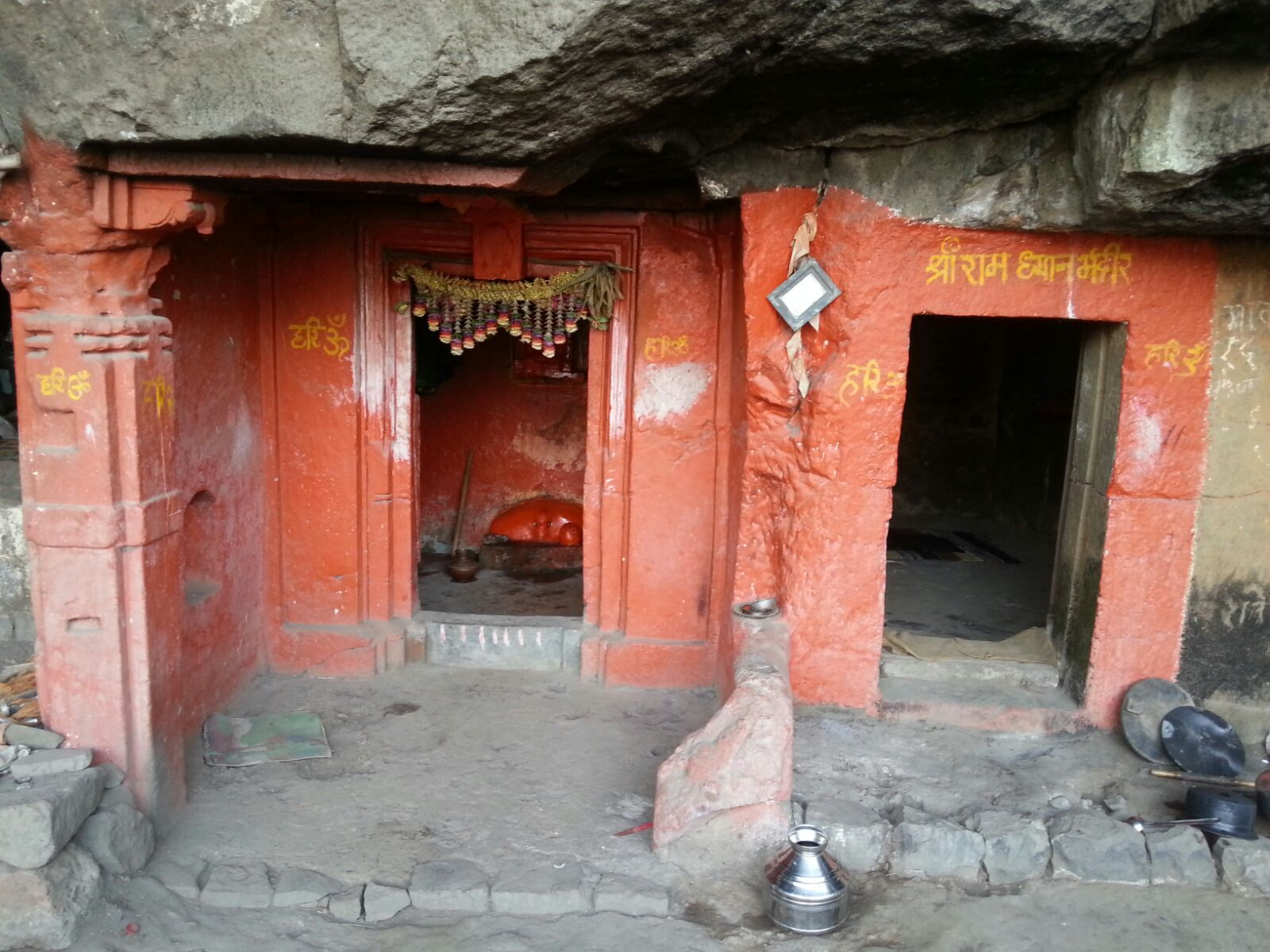
The temple

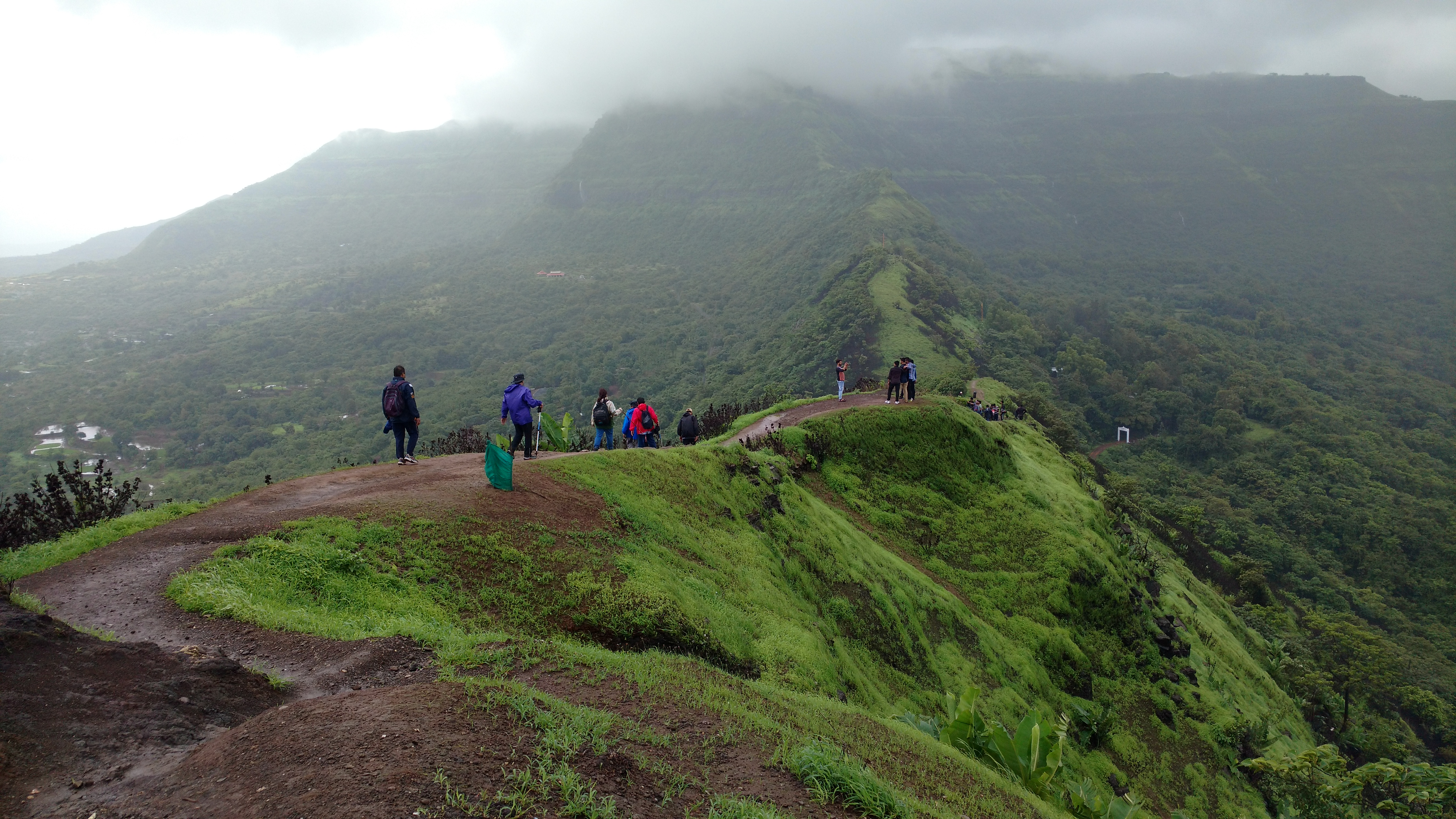
The trek path in Rainy season

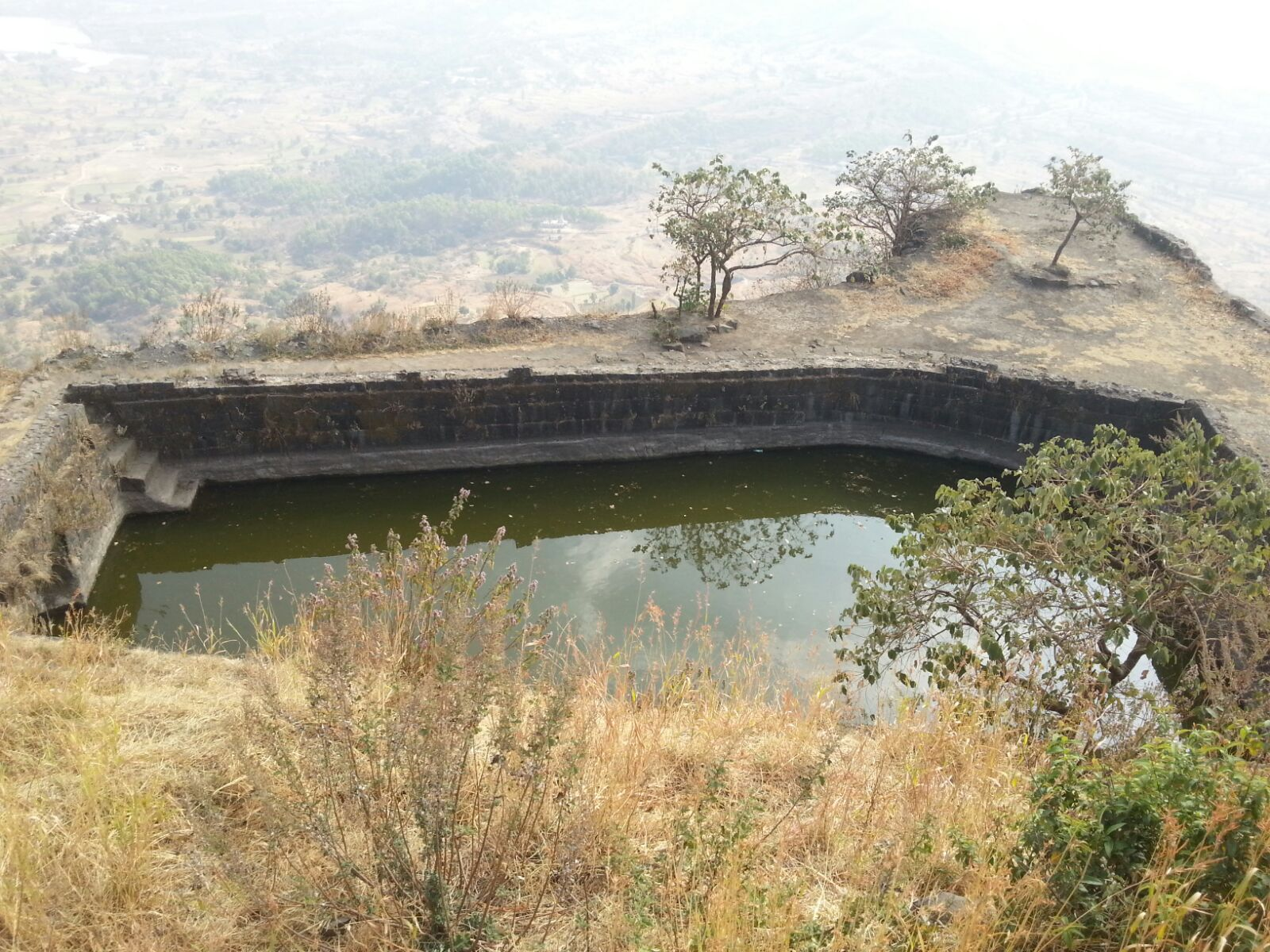
Rockcut water cistern on the fort

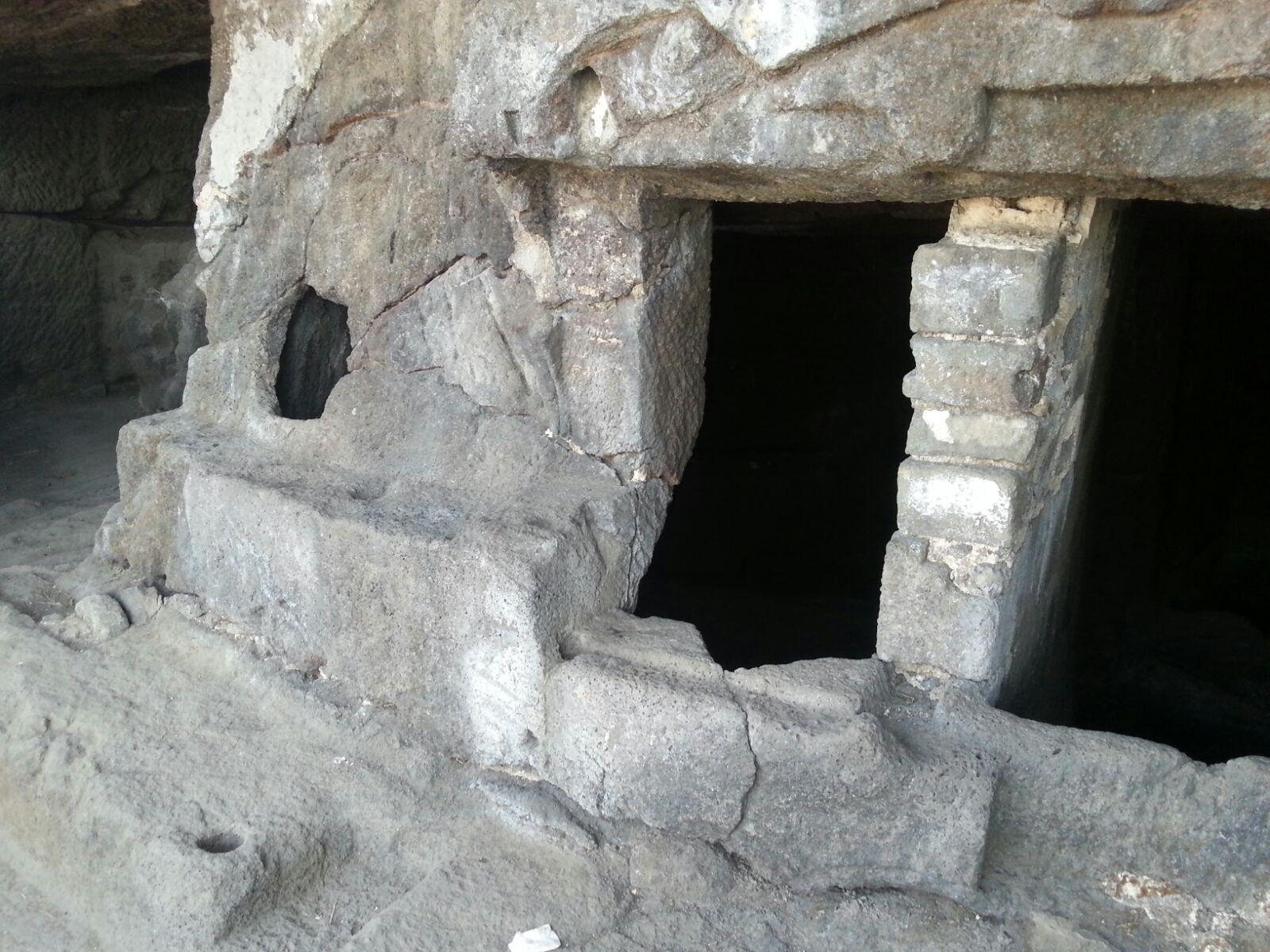
Caves on the fort

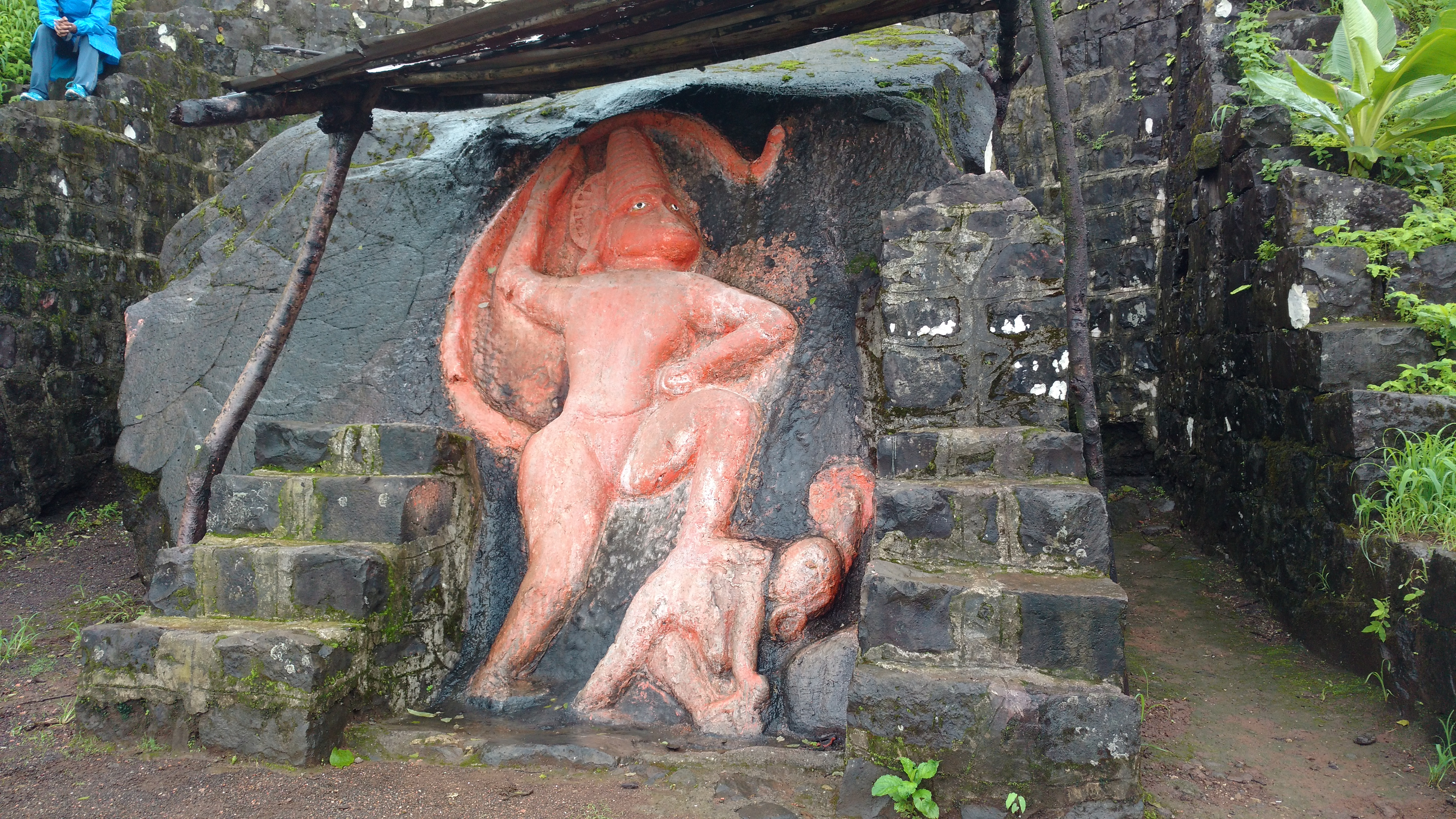
Idol of Veer maruti
