= Pavananagar =

Village in Maharashtra

- Town
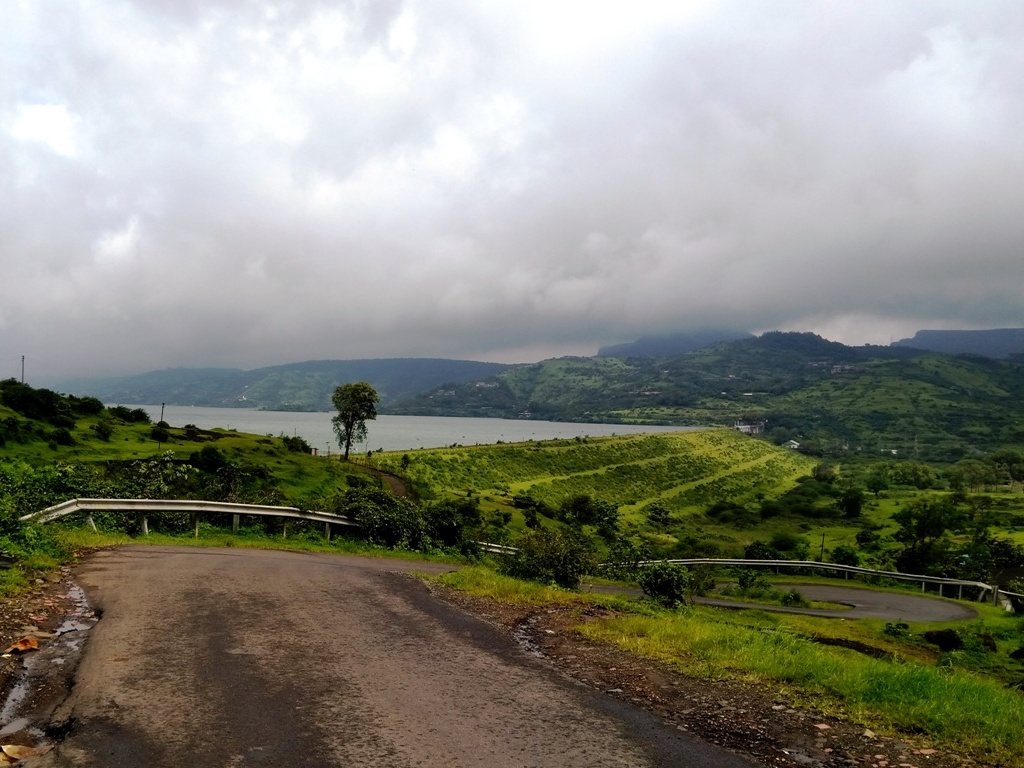
- Pavana Dam backwaters near Pavananagar
- Country: India
- State: Maharashtra
- District: Pune district
- Taluka: Maval taluka
- Named for: Pavana River

Pavananagar is a village near Pavana Dam in Maharashtra, India. It is about 45 km via Paud and 65 km via Kamshet from Pune. There are roads to Pavananagar from Pune & Lonavala. Lonavala to Pavana Dam is 20 km; 40 minutes journey from Lonavala.

1. Lonavala → Bhangarwadi → Kusgaon → Aundhgaon → Dudhivarekhind → Prati Pandharpur → Pavana Dam
2. Pune → Pirangut → Paud → Kolvan → Pavana Dam → Pavananagar.
3. Pune → Nigdi → Kamshet → Bedsa → Pavananagar.

== Pavana Dam ==
Pavana Dam is constructed across the Pavana River. The construction began in the year 1962 and was completed in 1973. The backwaters of this dam provide a wonderful view. The way from Lonavala to Pavana Dam is 20 km; 40 minutes journey from Lonavala.

1. Lonavala → Bhangarwadi → Kusgaon → Aundh Gaon → Dudhivarekhind → Prati Pandharpur → Pavana Dam

Way from Pune, Pune - Pavananagar via Paud is beautiful during monsoon. The Tikona fort is close to this dam. Seven Kilometers from this dam is Mantra Mandir at Prati-Pandharpur. Aamby Valley City is also close to this dam.

=== Forts Near Pavana Nagar ===
- Tikona– 4
- Tung – 22 km
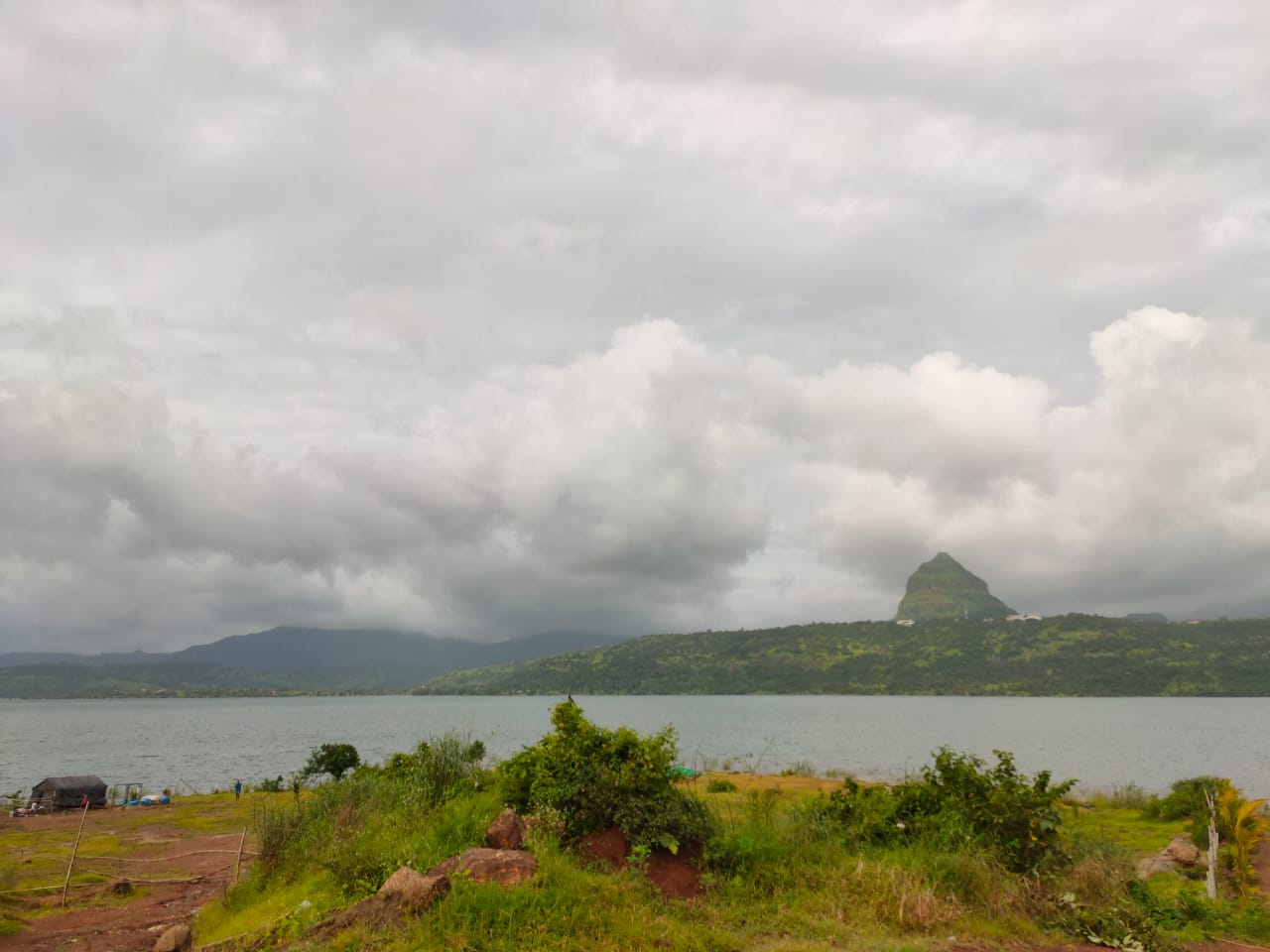
- A scene in Pavananagar, Maharashtra, India
  Lohagad – 16 km
- Visapur – 17 km
- Morgiri – 21 km
- Rajmachi – 38 km

=== Dams Near Pavana Nagar ===
- Pavana Dam - 4 Km
- Malavandi – 5 km
- Hadshi – 7 km
- Mulshi – 34 km
- Bhushi – 24 km
- Valvan – 22 km

=== Caves Near Pavana Nagar ===
- Karla – 30 km
- Bhaje – 30 km
- Bedse – 10 km
- Tikona – 5 km

== Location ==
State: Maharashtra Tal [Maval] District: Pune

Nearest Town: Pune / Pimpri-Chinchwad / Lonavala

Distance from Pune: Around 45 km (via Paud), Around 65 km (via Kamshet)

Distance from Mumbai: Around 108km (via Mumbai-Pune Expressway), Around 109 km (via National Highway 48)
