= Samundra Institute of Maritime Studies =

Samumdra Institute of Maritime Studies (SIMS)
- Other names: SIMS
- Type: Private
- Established: 1 August 2005
- Affiliations: Indian Maritime University, Directorate General of Shipping, Executive Ship Private Limited.
- Principal: Maneesh Jha
- Academic staff: 70+
- Undergraduates: 200+
- Postgraduates: 150+
- Location: Lonavala, Pune, Maharashtra, India; 18.7649°N 73.5056°E
- Colours: White
- Website: www.samundra.com

The Samundra Institute of Maritime Studies is one of India's advanced centres of marine engineering (marine propulsion) and navigation.

In addition to research, the institution offers extensive education and training in pre-sea and post-sea training for candidates ranging from cadets, on up through masters of ships. The institute is recognised by the D.G Shipping, Government of India and affiliated to Indian Maritime University. The institute is sponsored by the Executive Ship Management Private Limited, Singapore. Spread over fifty acres (twenty hectares) of land along the Indrayani River, on National Highway No.4 near Pune, India, the institute includes residential facilities for 400 candidates, an auditorium, a catering centre, an administration building, a "ship-in-campus", a Maritime science centre and a nautical and engineering workshop and swimming pool. The Institute boasts of LPG Simulator, one of its kind in the world, with hardware and software integrated together. The institute is the only maritime training institute in India to have a free fall life boat training facility.

== Overview ==
The institute has been operational since 1 August 2005 with its pioneer batch comprising 40 deck cadets selected on merit and the first batch of Graduate Marine Engineering Scheme training started from October 2005. The curriculum for the cadet training, provides the candidate with the essential theoretical and practical training so as to prepare them to endure and excel in the life faced at sea. The institute is a backward integration of Executive Ship Management Private Limited (ESM), a ship management company based in Singapore. Having instituted a post sea training facility, SIMS embarked on another training project in starting a pre sea training facility for deck and engine cadets. Located at Lonavala, Maharashtra, this campus complements the present post sea training offered in Govandi, Mumbai.

The institute was assessed in a comprehensive inspection program by the DG Shipping Govt of India in year 2015 and ranked No 1 among all maritime training institutes in India. The criteria for assessment included infrastructure, ambience, faculty and quality of training imparted, student development program, onboard training and placement records.

== Sustainable energy ==
The campus is notable for its employment of solar photovoltaic panels, one on a ninety-meter (293') long solar wall, is the longest in the world. Water is heated through the employment of solar heating panels. The campus plan is devised to re-generate the subterranean aquifer system. A water collection pool, near the river, acts as a holding pool, recharging and sustaining the micro-environment and bio-diversity of the campus. A system of canals and water management devices, temper the flow and retention of water in this drought prone area.

== Contemporary architecture ==
The campus has been designed by the award-winning architect Christopher Charles Benninger who has also designed the Mahindra United World College of India, the Center for Development Studies and Activities and the new campus for the Indian Institute of Management at Calcutta. The buildings have set a new trend in Indian modern architecture. The Samundra Institute of Maritime Studies (SIMS) near Mumbai was established by Executive Ship Management (ESM) Singapore.

== Accreditation ==
- ICRA Top Grade.
- Recognized by the Directorate General of Shipping, India.
- Indian Maritime University
- Maritime and Port Authority of Singapore.
- Det Norske Veritas, Norway for ISO 9001:2015.
- Maritime and Coastguard Agency (UK), Panama, Liberia and Marshall Islands Authorities (Ship Security Officers Course).
- Executive Ship Management Private Limited, Singapore. (Owner of SIMS)
- BP Shipping (Partner)

== Training facilities ==
The institute is spread out over a floor area in excess of 20,000 sq feet, SIMS provides hands-on training on simulators and various equipment as well as a training courses to ESM's officers and ratings. The simulators include the only 240° field of view bridge simulator presently in India, an engine room simulator and a liquid cargo handling simulator – all loaded with programme modules based on present vessels under ESM's management.

Some of the key facilities include

- Simulators
1. 240° Field of View Full Mission Bridge Simulator.
2. Engine Room Full Mission Simulator.
3. Liquid Cargo Handling Simulator (LCHS) for oil, gas and chemical cargoes.
4. Electronic Chart Display Information System (ECDIS) simulator.
5. Inert Gas Plant.

Ship in SIMS Campus, Lonavala

- Equipment
1. Fully fitted-out Cargo Tank Replica with Framo pump.
2. Automation Control Engineering Laboratory
3. Hydraulic Trainer Equipment.
4. Pneumatic Trainer Equipment.
5. Miura Boiler Combustion equipment and controls.
6. Terasaki Group Starter Panel.
7. Main Engine Manoeuvring System.
- Other Fittings
1. Basic electronic trainers
2. Tanker fittings such as PV valves, tank cleaning machine
3. Safety equipment such as BA sets, fireman's suit, BA compressor etc.
- Other Facilities
1. Conference Hall
2. Library
3. Auditorium
4. Briefing room
5. Classrooms
6. Student hostel with rooms
7. Catering center
8. Swimming pool, sports and recreational facilities

== Awards ==
The institute has won the following awards for its architecture:

- J.K. Cement-Architect of the Year Awards 2009, Best Educational Institute Award
- Indian Institute Architects Award 2008, Excellence in Architecture for Best Public Building
- Institute of Steel Development & Growth (INSDAG) 2009, Runner's up for Best Steel Structure in India
- ArchiDesign Awards 2009, Architect of the Year Award
- World Architecture Festival Award 2009, Barcelona, Category: Education – Finalist

== Pre sea courses at SIMS Lonavla ==
SN	Course Name	Duration
1.	DNS leading to BSc. Nautical Science (Deck Officer Training)	1 year
2.	GME (Engine Officer Training)	1 year
3.	B.Tech. Marine Engineering (Engine Officer Training)	4 years
4.	ETO (Electro Technical Officer)	4 months

== Post sea mandatory courses at SIMS Mumbai/Lonavala/Chandigarh/ Cochin ==
SN	Course Name	Duration
1.	Chemical Tanker Familiarisation	5 days
2.	Specialised Training Program on Chemical Tanker Operations	12 days
3.	Oil Tanker Familiarisation	5 days
4.	Specialised Training Program on Oil Tanker Operations	2 weeks
5.	Liquefied Gas Tanker Familiarisation	5 days
6.	Specialised Training Program on Gas Tanker Operations	2 weeks
7.	Liquid Cargo Handling Simulator – Management Level	5 days
8.	Liquid Cargo Handling Simulator – Operational Level	3 days
9.	Engine Simulator - Management Level	5 days
10.	Engine Simulator - Operational Level	3 days
11.	Ship Manoeuvring Simulator	5 days
