= Principles of intelligent urbanism =

Theory of urban planning

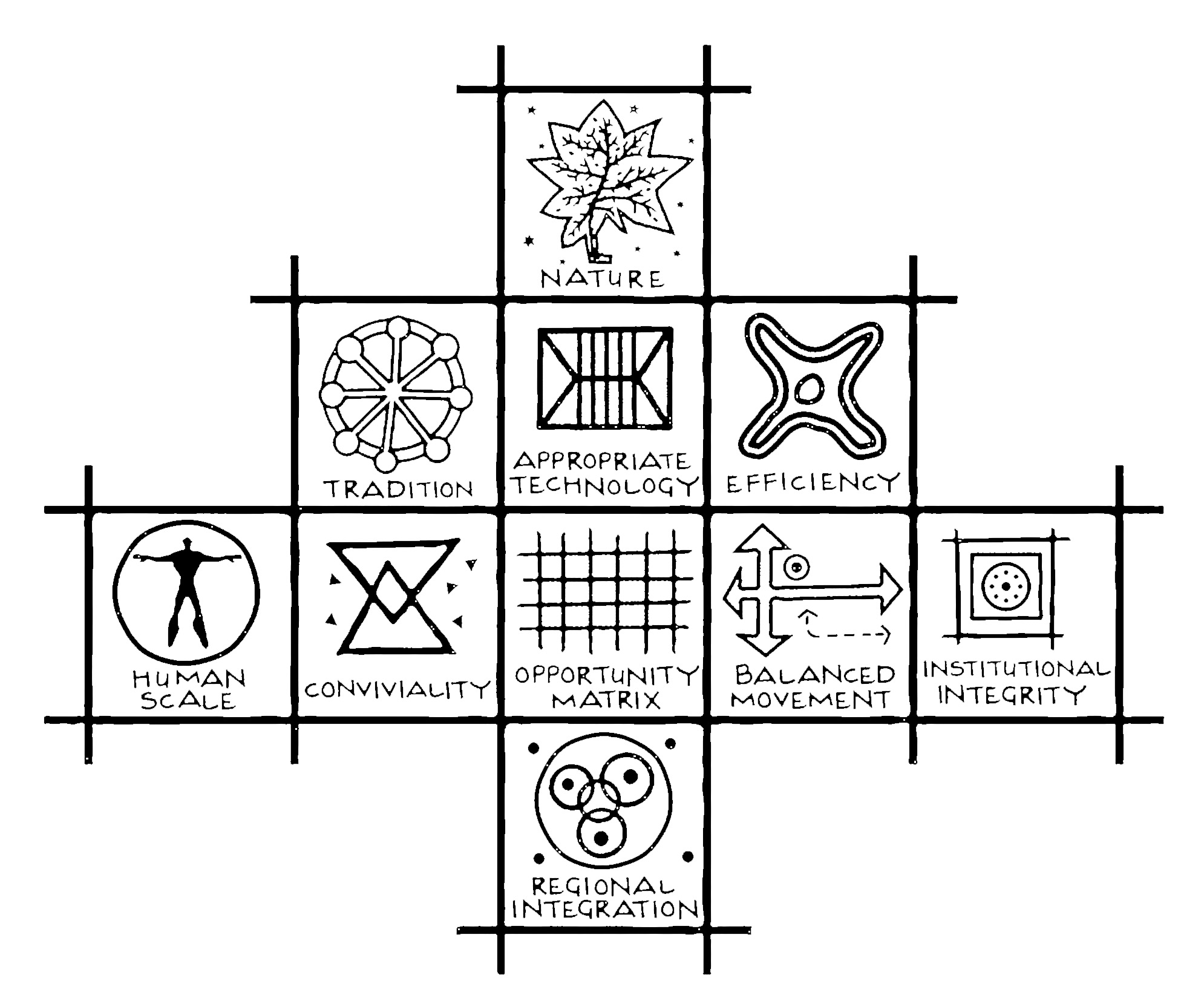
Ten icons for the ten principles.

Principles of intelligent urbanism (PIU) is a theory of urban planning composed of a set of ten axioms intended to guide the formulation of city plans and urban designs. They are intended to reconcile and integrate diverse urban planning and management concerns. These axioms include environmental sustainability, heritage conservation, appropriate technology, infrastructure-efficiency, placemaking, social access, transit-oriented development, regional integration, human scale, and institutional integrity. The term was coined by Prof. Christopher Charles Benninger.

The PIU evolved from the city planning guidelines formulated by the International Congress of Modern Architecture (CIAM), the urban design approaches developed at Harvard's pioneering Urban Design Department under the leadership of Josep Lluis Sert, and the concerns enunciated by Team Ten. It is most prominently seen in plans prepared by Christopher Charles Benninger and his numerous colleagues in the Asian context. They form the elements of the planning curriculum at the School of Planning, CEPT University, Ahmedabad, which Benninger founded in 1971. They were the basis for the new capital plan for Thimphu, Bhutan.

== Axioms ==
=== Principle one: a balance with nature ===
According to proponents of intelligent urbanism, balance with nature emphasizes the distinction between utilizing resources and exploiting them. It focuses on the thresholds beyond which deforestation, soil erosion, aquifer depletion, siltation and flooding reinforce one another in urban development, saving or destroying life support systems. The principle promotes environmental assessments to identify fragile zones, threatened ecosystems and habitats that can be enhanced through conservation, density control, land use planning and open space design. This principle promotes life cycle building energy consumption and pollutant emission analysis.

This principle states there is a level of human habitation intensity wherein the resources that are consumed will be replaced through the replenishing natural cycles of the seasons, creating environmental equilibrium. Embedded in the principle is contention that so long as nature can resurge each year; So long as the biomass can survive within its own eco-system; so long as the breeding grounds of fauna and avifauna are safe; so long as there is no erosion and the biomass is maintained, nature is only being utilized.

Underlying this principle is the supposition that there is a fragile line that is crossed when the fauna, which cross-fertilizes the flora, which sustains the soil, which supports the hillsides, is no longer there. Erosion, siltation of drainage networks and flooding result. After a point of no return, utilization of natural resources will outpace the natural ability of the eco-system to replenish itself. From there on degradation accelerates and amplifies. Deforestation, desertification, erosion, floods, fires and landslides all increase.

The principle states that blatant "acts against nature" include cutting of hillside trees, quarrying on slopes, dumping sewage and industrial waste into the natural drainage system, paving and plinthing excessively, and construction on steep slopes. This urban theory proposes that the urban ecological balance can be maintained when fragile areas are reserved, conservation of ecosystems is pursued, and low intensity habitation precincts are thoughtfully identified. Thus, the principles operate within the balance of nature, with a goal of protecting and conserving those elements of the ecology that nurture the environment. Therefore, the first principle of intelligent urbanism is that urbanization be in balance with nature.

=== Principle two: a balance with tradition ===
Balance with tradition is intended to integrate plan interventions with existing cultural assets, respecting traditional practices and precedents of style. This urban planning principle demands respect for the cultural heritage of a place. It seeks out traditional wisdom in the layout of human settlements, in the order of building plans, in the precedents of style, in the symbols and signs that transfer meanings through decoration and motifs. This principle respects the order engendered into building systems through years of adaptation to climate, to social circumstances, to available materials and to technology. It promotes architectural styles and motifs designed to communicate cultural values.

This principle calls for orienting attention toward historic monuments and heritage structures, leaving space at the ends of visual axis to “frame" existing views and vistas. Natural views and vistas demand respect, assuring that buildings do not block major sight lines toward visual assets.

Embedded in the principle is the concern for unique cultural and societal iconography of regions, their signs and symbols. Their incorporation into the spatial order of urban settings is promoted. Adherents promote the orientation and structuring of urban plans using local knowledge and meaning systems, expressed through art, urban space and architecture.

Planning decisions must operate within the balance of tradition, aggressively protecting, promoting and conserving generic components and elements of the urban pattern.

=== Principle three: appropriate technology ===
Appropriate technology emphasizes the employment of building materials, construction techniques, infrastructural systems and project management which are consistent with local contexts. People's capacities, geo-climatic conditions, locally available resources, and suitable capital investments all temper technology. Where there are abundant craftspeople, labour-intensive methods are appropriate. Where there is surplus savings, capital intensive methods are appropriate. For every problem there is a range of potential technologies, which can be applied, and an appropriate fit between technology and other resources must be established. Proponents argue that accountability and transparency are enhanced by overlaying the physical spread of urban utilities and services upon electoral constituencies, such that people's representatives are interlinked with the urban technical systems needed for a civil society. This principle is in sync with "small is beautiful" concepts and with the use of local resources.

=== Principle four: conviviality ===
The fourth principle sponsors social interaction through public domains, in a hierarchy of places, devised for personal solace, companionship, romance, domesticity, "neighborliness," community and civic life. According to proponents of intelligent urbanism, vibrant societies are interactive, socially engaging and offer their members numerous opportunities for gathering and meeting one another. The PIU maintain that this can be achieved through design and that society operates within hierarchies of social relations which are space specific. The hierarchies can be conceptualized as a system of social tiers, with each tier having a corresponding physical place in the settlement structure.

==== A place for the individual ====
A goal of intelligent urbanism is to create places of solitude. These may be in urban forests, along urban hills, beside quiet streams, in public gardens and in parks where one can escape to meditate and contemplate. According to proponents, these are the quiet places wherein the individual consciousness dialogues with the rational mind. Idle and random thought sorts out complexities of modern life and allows the obvious to emerge. It is in these natural settings that the wandering mind finds its measure and its balance. Using ceremonial gates, directional walls and other “silent devices" these spaces are denoted and divined. Places of the individual cultivate introspection. These spaces may also be the forecourts and interior courtyards of public buildings, or even the thoughtful reading rooms of libraries. Meditation focuses one's thought. Intelligent urbanism creates a domain for the individual to mature through self-analysis and self-realization.

==== A place for friendship ====
The axiom insists that in city plans there must be spaces for “beautiful, intimate friendship" where unfettered dialogue can happen. This principle insists that such places will not exist naturally in a modern urban fabric. They must be a part of the conscientious design of the urban core, of the urban hubs, of urban villages and of neighborhoods, where people can meet with friends and talk out life's issues, sorrows, joys and dilemmas. This second tier is important for the emotional life of the populace. It sponsors strong mental health within the people, creating places where friendship can unfold and grow.

==== A place for householders ====
There must be spaces for householders, which may be in the form of dwellings for families, or homes for intimate companions, and where young workmates can form a common kitchen. Whatever their compositions, there must be a unique domain for social groups, familiar or biological, which have organized themselves into households. These domestic precincts are where families live and carry out their day-to-day functions of life. This third tier of conviviality is where the individual socializes into a personality.

Housing clusters planned according to this axiom create a variety of household possibilities, which respond to a range of household structures and situations. It recognizes that households transform through the years, requiring a variety of dwellings types that respond to a complex matrix of needs and abilities, which are provided for in city plans.

==== A place for the neighborhood ====
Smaller household domains must cluster into a higher social domain, the neighborhood social group. Good city planning practice sponsors, through design, such units of social space. It is in this fourth tier of social life that public conduct takes on new dimensions and groups learn to live peacefully among one another. It is through neighborhoods that the “social contract" amongst diverse households and individuals is sponsored. This social contract is the rational basis for social relations and negotiations within larger social groups. Within neighborhoods basic amenities like creches, early learning centers, preventive health care and rudimentary infrastructure are maintained by the community.

==== A place for communities ====
The next social tier, or hierarchy, is the community. Historically, communities were tribes who shared social mores and cultural behavioral patterns. In contemporary urban settings communities are formed of diverse people. But these are people who share the common need to negotiate and manage their spatial settings. In plans created through the principles of intelligent urbanism these are called urban villages. Like a rural village, social bonds are found in the community management of security, common resources and social space. Urban villages will have defined social spaces, services and amenities that need to be managed by the community. According to proponents of intelligent urbanism these urban villages optimally become the administrative wards, and therefore the constituencies, of the elected members of municipal bodies. Though there are no physical barriers to these communities, they have their unique spatial social domain. Intelligent urbanism calls for the creation of dense, walkable zones in which the inhabitants recognize each other's faces, share common facilities and resources, and often see each other at the village centre. This fifth tier of social space is where one needs initiative to join into various activities. It is intended to promote initiative and constructive community participation. There are opportunities for one to be involved in the management of services, and amenities and to meet new people. They accommodate primary education and recreation areas. Good planning practice promotes the creation of community places, where community-based organizations can manage common resources and resolve common problems.

==== A place for the city domain ====
The principles of intelligent urbanism call for city level domains. These can be plazas, parks, stadia, transport hubs, promenades, "passages" or gallerias. These are social spaces where everyone can go. In many cities one has to pay an entrance fee to access “public spaces" like malls and museums. Unlike the lower tiers of the social hierarchy, this tier is not defined by any biological, familiar, face-to-face or exclusive characteristic. One may find people from all continents, from nearby districts and provinces and from all parts of the city in such places. By nature these are accessible and open spaces, with no physical, social or economic barriers. According to this principle it is the rules of human conduct that order this domain's behavior. It is civility, or civilization, which protects and energizes such spaces. At the lower tiers, one meets people through introductions, through family ties, and through neighborhood circumstances.

These domains would include all freely accessible large spaces. These are places where outdoor exhibits are held, sports matches take place, vegetables are sold and goods are on display. These are places where visitors to the city meander amongst the locals. Such places may stay the same, but the people are always changing. Most significant, these city scale public domains foster public interaction; they sponsor unspoken ground rules for unknown people to meet and to interact. They nurture civic understanding of the strength of diversity, variety, a range of cultural groups and ethnic mixes. It is this higher tier of social space which defines truly urbane environments.

Every social system has its own hierarchy of social relations and interactions. Intelligent urbanism sees cyberspace as a macro tier of conviviality, but does not discount physical places in forging relationships due to the Internet. These are reflected through a system of ‘places’ that respond to them. Good urban planning practice promotes the planning and design of such ‘places’ as elemental components of the urban structure.

=== Principle five: efficiency ===
The principle of efficiency promotes a balance between the consumption of resources such as energy, time and fiscal resources, with planned achievements in comfort, safety, security, access, tenure, productivity and hygiene. It encourages optimum sharing of public land, roads, facilities, services and infrastructural networks, reducing per household costs, while increasing affordability, productivity, access and civic viability.

Intelligent urbanism promotes a balance between performance and consumption. Intelligent urbanism promotes efficiency in carrying out functions in a cost effective manner. It assesses the performance of various systems required by the public and the consumption of energy, funds, administrative time and the maintenance efforts required to perform these functions.

A major concern of this principle is transport. While recognizing the convenience of personal vehicles, it attempts to place costs (such as energy consumption, large paved areas, parking, accidents, negative balance of trade, pollution and related morbidity) on the users of private vehicles.

Good city planning practice promotes alternative modes of transport, as opposed to a dependence on personal vehicles. It promotes affordable public transport. It promotes medium to high-density residential development along with complementary social amenities, convenience shopping, recreation and public services in compact, walkable mixed-use settlements. These compact communities have shorter pipe lengths, wire lengths, cable lengths and road lengths per capita. More people share gardens, shops and transit stops.

These compact urban nodes are spaced along regional urban transport corridors that integrate the region's urban nodes, through public transport, into a rational system of growth. Good planning practice promotes clean, comfortable, safe and speedy public transport, which operates at dependable intervals along major origin and destination paths. Such a system is cheaper, safer, less polluting and consumes less energy.

The same principle applies to public infrastructure, social facilities and public services. Compact, high-density communities result in more efficient urban systems, delivering services at less cost per unit to each citizen.

There is an appropriate balance to be found somewhere on the line between wasteful low-density individual systems and over-capitalized mega systems. Individual septic tanks and water bores servicing individual households in low-density fragmented layouts, allow the use of filtered greywater for free irrigation of gardens, but, if not maintained, can cause a local pollution of subterranean aquifer systems. The bores can dramatically lower ground water levels especially during droughts. The advantage of septic tanks and bores is to be managed by the very users, at no cost for the community. Alternatively, large-scale, citywide sewerage systems and regional water supply systems are capital intensive and prone to management and maintenance dysfunction, if not corruption or extortion by private companies. Operating costs, user fees and cost recovery expenses are high. There is a balance wherein medium-scale systems, covering compact communities, utilize modern technology, without the pitfalls of large-scale infrastructure systems. This principle of urbanism promotes the middle path with regard to public infrastructure, facilities, services and amenities.

When these appropriate facilities and service systems overlap electoral constituencies, the “imagery" between user performance in the form of payments for services, systems dependability through managed delivery, and official response through effective representation, should all become obvious and transparent.

Good city planning practices promote compact settlements along dense urban corridors, and within populated networks, such that the numbers of users who share costs are adequate to support effective and efficient infrastructure systems. Intelligent urbanism is intended to foster movement on foot, linking pedestrian movement with public transport systems at strategic nodes and hubs. Medium-scale infrastructural systems, whose catchment areas overlap political constituencies and administrative jurisdictions, result in transparent governance and accountable urban management.

=== Principle six: human scale ===
Intelligent urbanism encourages ground level, pedestrian oriented urban patterns, based on anthropometric dimensions. Walkable, mixed use urban villages are encouraged over single-function blocks, linked by motor ways, and surrounded by parking lots.

An abiding axiom of urban planning, urban design and city planning has been the promotion of people friendly places, pedestrian walkways and public domains where people can meet freely. These can be parks, gardens, glass-covered gallerias, arcades, courtyards, street side cafes, river- and hill-side stroll ways, and a variety of semi-covered spaces.

Intelligent urbanism promotes the scale of the pedestrian moving on the pathway, as opposed to the scale of the automobile on the expressway. Intelligent urbanism promotes the ground plan of imaginable precincts, as opposed to the imagery of façades and the monumentality of the section. It promotes the personal visibility of places moving on foot at eye level.

Intelligent urbanism advocates removing artificial barriers and promotes face-to-face contact. Proponents argue that the automobile, single use zoning and the construction of public structures in isolated compounds, all deteriorate the human condition and the human scale of the city.

According to PIU proponents, the trend towards urban sprawl can be overcome by developing pedestrian circulation networks along streets and open spaces that link local destinations. Shops, amenities, day care, vegetable markets and basic social services should be clustered around public transport stops, and at a walkable distance from work places, public institutions, high and medium density residential areas. Public spaces should be integrated into residential, work, entertainment and commercial areas. Social activities and public buildings should orient onto public open spaces. These should be the interchange sites for people on the move, where they can also revert into the realm of “slowness," of community life and of human interaction.

Human scale can be achieved through building masses that “step down" to human scale open spaces; by using arcades and pavilions as buffers to large masses; by intermixing open spaces and built masses sensitively; by using anthropometric proportions and natural materials. Traditional building precedents often carry within them a human scale language, from which a contemporary fabric of build may evolve.

The focus of intelligent urbanism is the ground plane, pedestrian movement and interaction along movement channels, stems, at crossing nodes, at interactive hubs and within vibrant urban cores. The PIU holds many values in common with Transit Oriented Development, but the PIU goal is not merely to replace the automobile, nor to balance it. These are mundane requirements of planning, which the PIU assumes are found in every design and urban configuration. The PIU goal is to enrich the human condition and to enhance the realm of human possibilities.

Intelligent urbanism conceives of urbanity as a process of facilitating human behavior toward more tolerant, more peaceful, more accommodating and more sensitive modalities of interaction and conflict resolution. Intelligent urbanism recognizes that ‘urbanity’ emerges where people mix and interact on a face-to-face basis, on the ground, at high densities and amongst diverse social and economic groups. Intelligent urbanism nurtures ‘urbanity’ through designs and plans that foster human scale interaction.

=== Principle seven: opportunity matrix ===
The PIU envisions the city as a vehicle for personal, social, and economic development, through access to a range of organizations, services, facilities and information providing a variety of opportunities for enhanced employment, economic engagement, education, and recreation. This principle aims to increase access to shelter, health care and human resources development. It aims to increase safety and hygienic conditions. The city is a place of economic opportunity. This is generally said with regard to urban annual net product, enriched urban economic base, sustained employment generation and urban balance of trade. More significantly this is true for the individuals who settle in cities. Moreover, cities are places where individuals can increase their knowledge, skills and sensitivities. Cities provide access to health care and preventive medicine. They provide a great umbrella of services under which the individual can leave aside the struggle for survival, and get on with the finer things of life.

The PIU sees cities as catalysts for personal definition and self-discovery. In cities people get inspired, build a drive to achieve, discover aspects of their personalities, skills and intellectual curiosity which they use to craft their identity.

The city provides a range of services and facilities, whose realization in villages are the all-consuming struggle of rural inhabitants. Potable water; sewerage management; energy for cooking, heat and lighting are all piped and wired in; solid waste disposal and storm water drainage are provided. The city offers access through roads, public transit, telephones and the Internet. The security provided by policing systems, and the courts of law, are assumed to be in the city. Then there are the schools, the recreation facilities, the health services and other professional services offered in the city market place.

Intelligent urbanism views the city as an opportunity system. Yet these opportunities are not equally distributed. Security, health care, education, shelter, hygiene, and most of all employment, are not equally accessible. Proponents of intelligent urbanism see the city as playing an equalizing role allowing citizens to grow according to their own essential capabilities and efforts. If the city is an institution, which generates opportunities, intelligent urbanism promotes the concept of equal access to opportunities within the urban system.

Intelligent urbanism promotes a guaranteed access to education, health care, police protection, and justice before the law, potable water, and a range of basic services. Perhaps this principle, more than any other, distinguishes intelligent urbanism from other elitist, efficiency oriented urban charters and regimes.

Intelligent urbanism does not say every household will stay in an equivalent house, or travel in the same vehicle, or consume the same amount of electricity.

Intelligent urbanism recognizes the existence of poverty, of ignorance, of ill health, of malnutrition, of low skills, of gender bias and ignorance of the urban system itself. Intelligent urbanism is courageous in confronting these forms of inequality, and backlogs in social and economic development. Intelligent urbanism sees an urban plan, not only as a physical plan, but also as a social plan and as an economic plan.

The ramifications of this understanding are that the people living in intelligent cities should not experience urban development in “standard doses". In short, people may be born equal or unequal, but they grow inequitably. An important role of the city is to provide a variety of paths and channels for each individual to set right their own future, against the inequity of their past, or the special challenges they face. According to proponents of this principle this is the most salient aspect of a free society; than even voting rights access to opportunity is the essence of self-liberation and human development.

According to proponents of intelligent urbanism, there will be a variety of problems faced by urbanites and they need a variety of opportunity channels for resolution. If there are ten problem areas where people are facing stresses, like economic engagement, health, shelter, food, education, recreation, transport, etc., there must be a variety of opportunities through which individuals and households can resolve each of these stresses. There must be ten channels to resolve each of ten stresses! If this opportunity matrix is understood and responded to, the city is truly functioning as an opportunity matrix. For example, opportunities for shelter could be through the channels of lodges, rented rooms, studio apartments, bedroom apartments and houses. It could be through the channels of ownership, through a variety of tendencies. It could be through opportunities for self-help, or incremental housing. It could be through the up-gradation of slums. Intelligent urbanism promotes a wide range of solutions, where any stress is felt. It therefore promotes a range of problem statements, options, and variable solutions to urban stresses.

Intelligent urbanism sees cities as processes. Proponents argue that good urban plans facilitate those processes and do not place barriers before them. For example, it does not judge a “slum" as a blight on society; it sees the possibility that such a settlement may be an opportunity channel for entry into the city. Such a settlement may be the only affordable shelter, within easy access to employment and education, for a new immigrant household in the city. According to intelligent urbanism, if the plan ignores, or destroys such settlements, it is creating a city of barriers and despair wherein a poor family, offering a good service to the city, is denied a modicum of basic needs for survival. Alternatively, if the urban plan recognizes that the “slum" is a mechanism for self development, a spring-board from which children have access to education, a place which can be up-graded with potable water, basic sanitary facilities, street lights and paving...then it is a plan for opportunity. Intelligent urbanism believes that there are slums of hope and slums of despair. It promotes slums of hope, which contribute, not only to individual opportunities, but also to nation building.

The opportunity matrix must also respond to young professionals, to skilled, well-paid day laborers, to the upper middle class and to affluent entrepreneurs. If a range of needs, of abilities to pay, of locational requirements, and of levels of development of shelter, is addressed, then opportunities are being created.

Intelligent urbanism believes that private enterprise is the logical provider of opportunities, but that alone it will not be just or effective. The regime of land, left to market forces alone, will create an exclusive, dysfunctional society. Intelligent urbanism believes that there is an essential role for the civil society to intervene in the opportunity matrix of the city.

Intelligent urbanism promotes opportunities through access to:

- Basic and primary education, skill development and knowledge about the urban world;
- Basic health care, potable water, solid waste disposal and hygiene;
- Urban facilities like storm drainage, street lights, roads and footpaths;
- Recreation and entertainment;
- Transport, energy, communications;
- Public participation and debate;
- Finance and investment mechanisms;
- Land and/or built-up space where goods and services can be produced;
- Rudimentary economic infrastructure;
- Intelligent urbanism provides a wide range of zones, districts and precincts where activities and functions can occur without detracting from one another.

Intelligent urbanism proposes that enterprise can only flourish where a public framework provides opportunities for enterprise. This system of opportunities operates through public investments in economic and social infrastructure; through incentives in the form of appropriate finance, tax inducements, subsidized skill development for workers, and: regulations which protect the environment, safety, hygiene and health. To ensure a stable playing field where one can make an investment with predictable returns, a modicum of regulation is necessary. Proponents argue that it is through government regulations that private investment can be protected from fraud. It is through government regulation that the under-pinning conditions for free enterprise can be protected.

=== Principle eight: regional integration ===
Intelligent urbanism envisions the city as an organic part of a larger environmental, socio-economic and cultural-geographic system, essential for its sustainability. This zone of influence is the region. Likewise, it sees the region as integrally connected to the city. Intelligent urbanism sees the planning of the city and its hinterland as a single holistic process. Proponents argue if one does not recognize growth as a regional phenomenon, then development will play a hopscotch game of moving just a bit further along an arterial roads, further up valleys above the municipal jurisdiction, staying beyond the path of the city boundary, development regulations and of the urban tax regime.

The region may be defined as the catchment area from which employees and students commute into the city on a daily basis. It is the catchment area from which people choose to visit one city, as opposed to another, for retail shopping and entertainment. Economically the city region may include the hinterland that depends on its wholesale markets, banking facilities, transport hubs and information exchanges. The region needing integration may be seen as the zone from which perishable foods, firewood and building materials supply the city. The economic region can also be defined as the area managed by exchanges in the city. Telephone calls to the region go through the city's telecom exchange; post goes through the city's general post office; money transfers go through the city's financial institutions and internet data passes electronically through the city's servers. The area over which “city exchanges" disperse matter can well be called the city's economic hinterland or region. Usually the region includes dormitory communities, airports, water reservoirs, perishable food farms, hydro facilities, out-of-doors recreation and other infrastructure that serves the city. Intelligent urbanism sees the integrated planning of these services and facilities as part of the city planning process.

Intelligent urbanism understands that the social and economic region linked to a city also has a physical form, or a geographic character. A hierarchy of watersheds, creating valleys and defining edges of neighborhoods, may define the geographic character. Forest ranges, fauna and avifauna habitats are set within such regions and are connected by natural corridors for movement and cross-fertilization. Within this larger, environmental scenario, one must conceptualize urbanism in terms of watersheds, subterranean aquifer systems, and other natural systems that operate across the entire region. Economic infrastructure, such as roads, hydro basins, irrigation channels, water reservoirs and related distribution networks usually follow the terrain of the regional geography. The region's geographic portals, and lines of control, may also define defense and security systems deployment.

Intelligent urbanism recognizes that there is always a spillover of population from the city into the region, and that population in the region moves into the city for work, shopping, entertainment, health care and education. With thoughtful planning the region can take pressure off of the city. Traditional and new settlements within the urban region can be enhanced and densified to accommodate additional urban households. There are many activities within the city, which are growing and are incompatible with urban habitat. Large, noisy and polluting workshops and manufacturing units are amongst these. Large wholesale markets, storage sheds, vehicular maintenance garages, and waste management facilities need to be housed outside of the city's limits in their own satellite enclaves. In larger urban agglomerations a number of towns and cities are clustered around a major urban center forming a metropolitan region.

Intelligent urbanism is not just planning for the present; it is also planning for the distant future. Intelligent urbanism is not Utopian, but futuristic in its need to forecast the scenarios to come, within its own boundaries, and within the boundaries of the distant future.

=== Principle nine: balanced movement ===
Intelligent urbanism advocates integrated transport systems comprising walkways, cycle paths, bus lanes, light rail corridors, under-ground metros and automobile channels. A balance between appropriate modes of movement is proposed. More capital intensive transport systems should move between high density nodes and hubs, which interchange with lower technology movement options. These modal split nodes become the public domains around which cluster high density, pedestrian, mixed-use urban villages.

The PIU accepts that the automobile is here to stay, but that it should not be made essential by design. A well planned metropolis would densify along mass transit corridors and around major urban hubs. Smaller, yet dense, urban nodes are seen as micro-zones of medium level density, public amenities and pedestrian access. At these points lower level nodal split will occur, such as between bus loops and cycle tracts. The PIU views nodal split points as places of urban conviviality and access to services and facilities. Modal split can be between walking, cycling, driving, and mass transit. Bus loops may feed larger rail-based rapid-movement corridors. Social and economic infrastructure becomes more intensive as movement corridors become more intense.

=== Principle ten: institutional transparency ===
Intelligent urbanism holds that good practices inherent in considered principles can only be realized through accountable, transparent, competent and participatory local governance, founded on appropriate data bases, due entitlements, civic responsibilities and duties. The PIU promotes a range of facilitative and promotive urban development management tools to achieve appropriate urban practices, systems and forms. None of the principles or practices the PIU promotes can be implemented unless there is a strong and rational institutional framework to define, channel and legalize urban development, in all of its aspects. Intelligent urbanism envisions the institutional framework as being very clear about the rules and regulations it sponsors and that those using discretion in implementing these measures must do so in a totally open, recorded and transparent manner.

Intelligent urbanism facilitates the public in carrying out their honest objectives. It does not regulate and control the public. It attempts to reduce the requirements, steps and documentation required for citizens to process their proposals.

Intelligent urbanism is also promotive in furthering the interests of the public in their genuine utilization of opportunities. It promotes site and services schemes for households who can construct their own houses. It promotes up-gradation of settlements with inadequate basic services. It promotes innovative financing to a range of actors who can contribute to the city's development. Intelligent urbanism promotes a limited role for government, for example in “packaging" large-scale urban development schemes, so that the private sector is promoted to actually build and market urban projects, which were previously built by the government.

Intelligent urbanism does not consider itself naïve. It recognizes that there are developers and promoters who have no long-term commitment to their own constructions, and their only concern is to hand over a dwelling, gain their profit and move on. For these players it is essential to have Development Control Regulations, which assure the public that the products they invest in are safe, hygienic, orderly, durable and efficient. For the discerning citizen, such rules also lay out the civil understanding by which a complex society agrees to live together.

The PIU contends that there must be a cadastral System wherein all of the land in the jurisdiction of cities is demarcated, surveyed, characterized and archived, registering its legal owner, its legal uses, and the tax defaults against it.

The institutional framework can only operate where there is a Structure Plan, or other document that defines how the land will be used, serviced, and accessed. The Structure Plan tells landowners and promoters what the parameters of development are, which assures that their immediate investments are secure, and that the returns and use of such efforts are predictable. A Structure Plan is intended to provide owners and investors with predictable future scenarios. Cities require efficient patterns for their main infrastructure systems and utilities. According to PIU proponents, land needs to be used in a judicious manner, organizing complementary functions and activities into compact, mixed use precincts and separating out non-compatible uses into their own precincts. In a similar manner, proponents argue it is only through a plan that heritage sites and the environment can be legally protected. Public assets in the form of nature, religious places, heritage sites and open space systems must be designated in a legal plan.

Intelligent urbanism proposes that the city and its surrounding region be regulated by a Structure Plan, or equivalent mechanism, which acts as a legal instrument to guide the growth, development and enhancement of the city.

According to proponents, there must be a system of participation by the “Stake Holders" in the preparation of plans. Public meetings, hearings of objections and transparent processes of addressing objections, must be institutionalized. Intelligent urbanism promotes Public Participation. Local Area Plans must be prepared which address local issues and take into account local views and sentiments regarding plan objectives, configurations, standards and patterns. Such plans lay out the sites of plots showing the roads, public open spaces, amenities areas and conservation sites. Land Pooling assures the beneficiaries from provision of public infrastructure and amenities proportionally contribute and that a few individuals do not suffer from reservations in the plan.

According to proponents, there must be a system of Floor Area Ratios to assure that the land and the services are not over pressured. No single plot owner should have more than the determined "fair share" of utilization of the access roads, amenities and utilities that service all of the sites. Floor Area Ratios temper this relationship as regulated the manner in which public services are consumed. According to PIU proponents, Transfer of Development Rights benefits land owners whose properties have been reserved under the plan. It also benefits the local authorities that lack the financial resources to purchase lands to implement the Structure Plans. It benefits concentrated, city center project promoters who have to amortize expensive land purchases, by allowing them to purchase the development rights from the owners of reserved lands and to hand over those properties to the plan implementing authority. This allows the local authority to widen roads and to implement the Structure Plan. The local authority then transfers the needed development right to city center promoters.

Intelligent urbanism supports the use of Architectural Guidelines where there is a tradition to preserve and where precedents can be used to specify architectural elements, motifs and language in a manner, which intended to reinforce a cultural tradition. Building designs must respect traditional elements, even though the components may vary greatly to integrate contemporary functions. Even in a greenfield setting Architectural Guidelines are required to assure harmony and continuity of building proportions, scale, color, patterns, motifs, materials and facades.

Intelligent urbanism insists on safety, hygiene, durability and utility in the design and construction of buildings. Where large numbers of people gather in schools, hospitals, and other public facilities that may become emergency shelters in disasters, special care must be exercised. A suitable Building Code is the proposed instrument to achieve these aims.

PIU proponents state that those who design buildings must be professionally qualified architects; those who design the structures (especially of more than ground plus two levels) must be professionally qualified structural engineers; those who build buildings must be qualified civil engineers; and, those who supervise and control construction must be qualified construction managers. Intelligent urbanism promotes the professionalisation of the city making process. While promoting professionalism, intelligent urbanism proposes that this not become a barrier in the development process. Small structures, low-rise structures, and humble structures that do not house many people can be self designed and constructed by the inhabitants themselves. Proponents maintain that there must be recognized Professional Accrediting Boards, or Professional Bodies, to see that urban development employs adequate technical competence.

Finally, there must be legislation creating statutory local authorities, and empowering them to act, manage, invest, service, protect, promote and facilitate urban development and all of the opportunities that a modern city must sponsor.

Intelligent urbanism insists that cities, local authorities, regional development commissions and planning agencies be professionally managed. City Managers can be hired to manage the delivery of services, the planning and management of planned development, the maintenance of utilities and the creation of amenities.

Intelligent urbanism views plans and urban designs and housing configurations as expressions of the people for whom they are planned. The processes of planning must therefore be a participatory involving a range of stakeholders. The process must be a transparent one, which makes those privileged to act as guardians of the people's will accountable for their decisions and choices. Intelligent urbanism sees urban planning and city governance as the most salient expressions of civility. Intelligent urbanism fosters the evolution of institutional systems that enhance transparency, accountability and rational public decision making.

== Movements implementing the ten principles ==
Though not necessarily related to the principles of intelligent urbanism, there are examples representing all or some of them in urban design theory and practice. Concurrently, the recent movements of New Urbanism and New Classical Architecture promote a sustainable approach towards construction, that appreciates and develops smart growth, architectural tradition and classical design. This in contrast to modernist and globally uniform architecture, as well as leaning against solitary housing estates and suburban sprawl. Both trends started in the 1980s. The Driehaus Architecture Prize is an award that recognizes efforts in New Urbanism and New Classical Architecture, and is endowed with a prize money twice as high as that of the modernist Pritzker Prize.

== See also ==
- Broadacre City
- Christopher Charles Benninger
- Garden city movement
- Josep Lluis Sert
- New Classical architecture
- New Urbanism
- Smart growth
- Social access
- Structure plan
- Sustainable city
- Sustainable Development Goal 11 – 11th of 17 Sustainable Development Goals for sustainable cities
- Team Ten
- Theories of urban planning
- Transit-oriented development
- Urban design
- Urban studies
- Urban village
- Urban vitality
- Vitruvius
