= Beed Khurd =

Village in Maharashtra

Beed Kh. village is located in Khalapur Tehsil of Raigad district in Maharashtra, India. It is situated 13 km away from sub-district headquarter Khalapur and 66 km away from district headquarter Alibag. Beed Khurd is the gram panchayat of Beed Kh village.

The total geographical area of village is 495.07 hectares. Beed Kh has a total population of 1,344 peoples. There are about 277 houses in Beed Kh village. Khopoli & Karjat is nearest town to Beed Kh.

This is small village located on the slopes of Borghāt. Beed Khurd Caves located on the eastern hill adjacent to the Beed khurd village. These are mainly two different cave structures. The cave number one is vihārā cave, containing a single monk cell, two inscriptions, some rock art and two incomplete excavation. Before these caves, there is a large natural cave appears at the beginning, which is approximately 20 to 25 feet long and 15 feet wide. It is likely that an excavation attempt has been made there. Because; a bench- like structure is initially appears. Also, signs of excavation are visible deep inside. Cave number two is originally a natural cave, and it appears that attempts have been made to convert it into a man-made cave.

Temple

- Bramhnath Gramdevata
- Hanuman Mandir
- Shankar Mandir A fair is held in honour of the temple deity on Mahashivaratri day - Maagha Vadya 13.
- Vitthal Rukhmini Mandir
- Ram Mandir
- Datta Mandir
- Karnjai Devi
- Gautam Buddha Vihar
- Beed Khurd Caves

School
RGP Marathi Shala Beed Kh.
