= Savera =

Savera may refer to:

- Savera (1942 film), Indian Hindi language film
- Savera (1958 film), Indian Hindi language film, directed by Satyen Bose and starring Ashok Kumar and Meena Kumari
- Savera Nadeem, Pakistani actress and director
- Savera Hotel, an 11-storied four-star hotel located in Mylapore, Chennai, India
