= Christopher Charles Benninger =

Indian architect and planner (1942–2024)

Prof. Dr. Christopher Charles Benninger
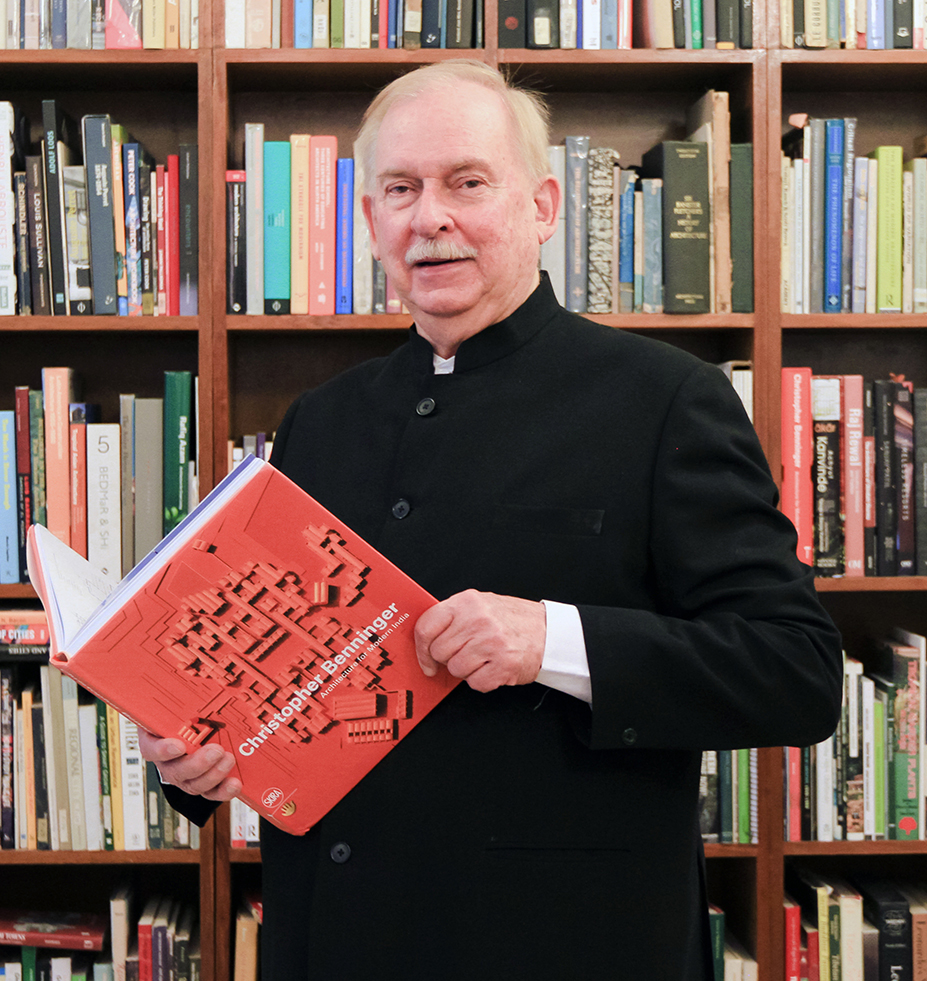
- Benninger in 2016
- Born: 23 November 1942; Hamilton, Ohio, U.S.
- Died: 2 October 2024 (aged 81); India House, Pune, Maharashtra, India
- Education: University of Florida (BA); Harvard University (M.Arch.); Massachusetts Institute of Technology (MCP)
- Occupation: Architect
- Awards: Great Master Architect of India; IIA Excellence in Architecture; Doctor of Philosophy (Honoris Causa) in Architecture, CEPT University
- Practice: CCBA Designs
- Buildings: Mahindra United World College; Suzlon One Earth Corporate Headquarters; Azim Premji University; Supreme Court of Bhutan, UN House, Ministry Buildings; Lodha Belmondo; College of Engineering Pune; Indian Institute of Technology, Hyderabad; IIM Calcutta; Parliament of Burundi; Bajaj Institute of Technology; Green Valley Global Headquarters China
- Projects: Site and Services EWS Housing at Arrambakkan, Jamnagar, Yusufgowda; Thane and Kalyan Development Plan; SOS Children's Villages at New Delhi and Kolkatta; Thimphu Structure Plan
- Website: ccba.in

Christopher Charles Benninger (23 November 1942 – 2 October 2024) was an Indian American architect and urban planner. Born in the United States, he permanently migrated to India in 1971 where he contributed to the field of critical regionalism and sustainable planning in India. Alongside architecture, Benninger is most identified with developing the Site and Services Model which was originally conceived as his thesis at Harvard GSD and his planning theory Principles of Intelligent Urbanism.

== Early life and education ==
Benninger was born in Hamilton, Ohio on November 23, 1942. Benninger graduated with a Bachelor of Architecture from the University of Florida in 1966. While at the University of Florida, he became interested in the civil rights movement and was a founder of the student-led "Freedom Party". Under Martin Luther King Jr.'s leadership, he and his sister, Judith Benninger Brown, actively supported the Congress of Racial Equality (CORE), entering segregated movie theaters and participating in restaurant sit-ins. Benninger completed his Master of Architecture from the Harvard Graduate School of Design in 1967. He studied under Josep Lluis Sert, Jerzy Soltan, and Mirko Basaldella. Benninger also studied development economics under John Kenneth Galbraith, ambassador to India and author of The New Industrial State.

While attending United Nations Security Council Meetings as an observer, Sir Robert Jackson gifted Benninger a lifetime subscription to the development journal Ekistics, introducing him to a science of human settlement centered around Constantinos Apostolos Doxiadis's theories. Barbara Ward became Benninger's lifelong mentor, inviting him to the 1967 Delos Symposium in Greece. After this, he first visited India as a Fulbright fellow in 1968. He continued his post-graduate studies at the Massachusetts Institute of Technology, under Horacio Caminos, working on the book Urban Dwelling Environments, and received a Master's degree in city planning in 1971.

== Career ==
=== Academic and research work ===
In 1971, Benninger returned to India as a Ford Foundation consultant to the Ahmedabad Education Society to help organize the School of Planning in 1972 along with Yoginder Alagh and B.V. Doshi. Benninger shifted to Pune in 1976 where he founded the Center for Development Studies and Activities. In 1983, Benninger wrote the theme paper for the United Nations Commission on Human Settlements in 1984. In 1986, he successfully argued to the Asian Development Bank the case for extending financial assistance to the urban development sector. Benninger was on the board of editors of Cities journal, published in the UK. He was on the board of Ekistics and the associate editor of Ekistics and the New Habitat. He was on the Board of the United States Education Foundation of India (Fulbright Foundation), Member of the Bureau of Indian Standards, and on the Board of University Teaching and Research at the University of Pune, and the Board of Governors of the School of Planning and Architecture in New Delhi.

=== Early projects ===
One of Benninger's first urban planning projects was an Economically Weaker Section (EWS) township in Jamnagar developed in collaboration with the Gujarat Housing Board in 1972. In 1973, he worked with the Chennai Metropolitan Development Authority and developed a site-and-services approach to EWS housing in Arunbakkam. In 1976, Benninger assisted the Hyderabad Urban Development Authority in its first project, a 2000-unit township for government employees. He designed the SOS Children's Villages in Bawana in 1975 and in Kolkatta three years later in 1978. In 1976, designed the Alliance Française Centre in Ahmedabad. In 1984, he designed the campus for the Center for Development Studies and Activities which he had founded in 1976.

=== Planning ===
As a World Bank consultant, Benninger planned out the site and services, core housing, and slum upgradation programmes for the Calcutta Metropolitan Development in 1974. In 1979, Benninger was assigned to a team tasked with designing and programming Indonesia's first National Rural Development Program, in collaboration with the newly established Urban Development Ministry. Later that year, under Christopher Benninger and Aneeta Benninger, CDSA developed India's pilot Integrated Rural Development Program. In this period, CDSA also prepared social inputs for Area Development Plans in Goa and Almora. With UNICEF, he led a CDSA team to prepare a plan of action for the development of Bhutan (1979–80). He was engaged by the UNCHS to develop plans for six cities in Sri Lanka: Jafna, Ratnapura, Kalutara, Hambantota, Galle, and Matara. In 1986, Benninger worked on the development plan for Thane and Kalyan with a focus on urban management and poverty upliftment. In 2001, Benninger was appointed to prepare the structure plan for Thimphu. In 2004, the Government of Bhutan along with the Government of India appointed him again to prepare plans for three towns along their shared border. In 2012, he designed the new town of Denchi in East Bhutan. Benninger's work in urban design, city management, and town planning resulted in his principles of intelligent urbanism. He designed the master plan for Sasson Hospital, King Edward Memorial Hospital and College of Engineering Pune. He was a member of the Mumbai Port Trust Land Development Committee and the head of the jury for the design and construction India's National War Memorial, appointed by the Ministry of Defence.

=== Architectural works ===
Benninger's designs include the Indian Institute of Technology, Hyderabad, the Indian Institute of Management, Calcutta, the Bajaj Institute of Technology, Suzlon One Earth Global Headquarters in Pune, the Mahindra United World College of India, the Samundra Institute of Maritime Studies, the YMCA International Camp in Nilshi, India, the Kirloskar Institute of Advanced Management Studies, Azim Premji University, in Bengaluru, 23 Metro Stations in Pune, and Tata Institute of Fundamental Research. Benninger's work has been noted as one of the first instances of critical regionalism in India.

== Personal life and death ==
Benninger was married to Aneeta Gokhale Benninger, an environmentalist, and had a son. Benninger died following a prolonged battle with cancer in Pune, Maharashtra, on 2 October 2024, at the age of 81.

Benninger had strong familial ties with American politician Adlai Stevenson II, who served as the 31st Governor of Illinois and later as the Democratic Party’s nominee for president of the United States in 1952 and 1956.

== Legacy ==
Benninger wrote three books, Christopher Benninger: Architecture for a Modern India (2015), a collection of his works, and Letters to a Young Architect (2011), a collection of lectures and articles, which is a bestseller in India. In October 2024, Great Expectations: Notes to an Architect, a sequel to his 2011 book was released posthumously. Benninger also spent his significant part of his life with his long term companion Ramprasad Akkisetti since 1993. They both founded CCBA, an architecture and planning firm in 1995.

== Publications ==
- Benninger, C. (2011). Letters to a Young Architect. India House Art Gallery. ISBN 9788192156804
- Falvo, R. M., & Akkisetti, R. (Eds.). (2015). Christopher Benninger: Architecture for Modern India. Skira editore SpA. ISBN 9788857226873
- Benninger, C. (2024). Great Expectations: Notes to an Architect. CEPT University Press & India House Art Gallery. ISBN 9789383184880

== Awards ==
Christopher Benninger has been the recipient of over 200 awards.

=== 2024 ===
- Baburao Mhatre Gold Medal - Indian Institute of Architects
- Honorary Doctorate of Philosophy in Architecture - CEPT University, Ahmedabad.

=== 2023 ===
- India's Top 10 Architects Awards - Construction World Architect and Builder (CWAB) Awards

=== 2019 ===
- Excellence in Architecture for Industrial category - Indian Institute of Architects

=== 2015 ===
- Lifetime Achievement Award - BERG Awards for Real Estate (Singapore)

=== 2014 ===
- Excellence in Architecture for Industrial category - Indian Institute of Architects

=== 2013 ===
- Excellence in Architecture Green Architecture - Indian Institute of Architects

=== 2008 ===
- Excellence in Architecture for Institutional Building - Indian Institute of Architects
- Great Master Architect Award - JK AYA Council of Architecture

=== 2001 ===
- Mahindra United World College of India won the Designer of the Year Award in 1999. It also was the recipient of the Business Week Architectural Record American Institute of Architects Award for Excellence in 2000. Business Week called the Mahindra United World College of India one of the ten super structures of the world in 2000.

=== 2000 ===
- Excellence in Architecture for Public Building - Indian Institute of Architects

== See also ==
- List of Massachusetts Institute of Technology alumni
- List of Harvard GSD Alumni
