= Mumbai–Pune Expressway =

Expressway in Maharashtra, India

Yashwantrao Chavan Expressway
- Mumbai–Pune Expressway
- Mumbai-Pune Expressway in red
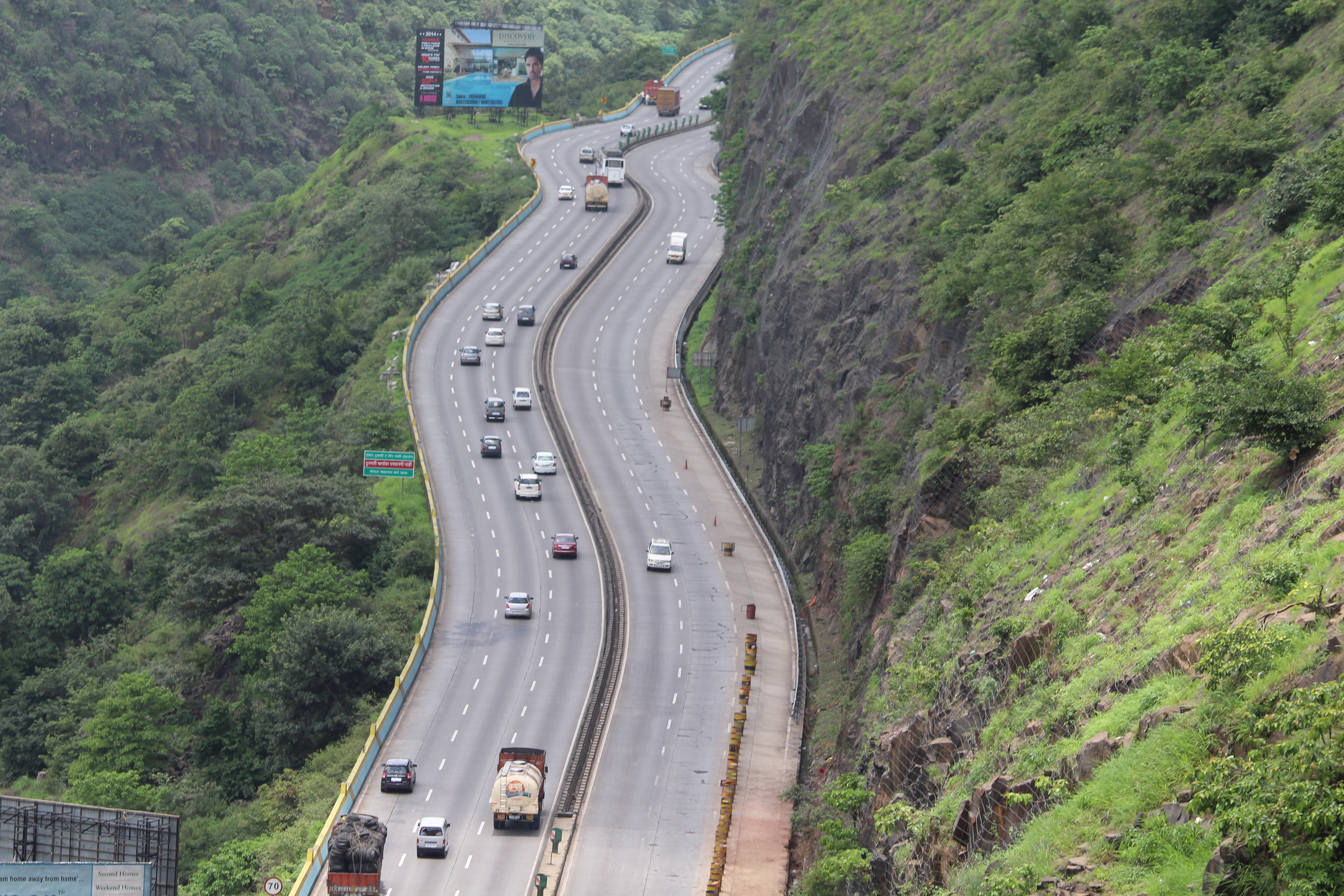

Route information
- Maintained by Maharashtra State Road Development Corporation (MSRDC)
- Length: 94.5 km (58.7 mi)
- Existed: April 2002; 24 years ago–present

Major junctions
- West end: Kalamboli, Navi Mumbai, Raigad District
- Sion Panvel Expressway near Panvel NH 548 in Kalamboli NH 48 in Kalamboli NH 48 in Ravet NH 48 in Khandala
- East end: Ravet, Pune

Location
- Country: India
- States: Maharashtra
- Major cities: Kalamboli, Panvel, Khalapur Khandala, Lonavala, Talegaon Dabhade

Highway system
- Roads in India; Expressways; National; State; Asian

The Mumbai–Pune Expressway (officially Yashwantrao Chavan Expressway) is India's first 6-lane wide concrete, access-controlled tolled expressway. It spans a distance of 94.5 km (58.7 mi) connecting Raigad-Navi Mumbai-Mumbai, the capital of Maharashtra state and the financial capital of India, with Pune, the cultural and educational capital of Maharashtra. The expressway, which was fully operationalized in 2002, introduced new levels of speed and safety in automobile transportation to Indian roads. It is one of India's busiest roads.

The expressway starts at Kalamboli in Raigad District's Navi Mumbai and ends at Kiwale in Pune. It cleaves through the scenic Sahyadri mountain ranges through passes and tunnels. It has five interchanges: Kon (Shedung), Chowk, Khalapur, Kusgaon and Talegaon. The expressway has two carriageways, each with three concrete lanes, separated by a central divider and a tarmac or concrete shoulder on either side. Pedestrians, pedal bicycles, two-wheelers, three-wheelers, bullock carts and tractors are not permitted, although tractor-trailers (semi-trailer rigs) are permitted. Vehicles are also prohibited from halting on the expressway. The expressway handles about 43,000 PCUs daily, and is designed to handle up to 1,00,000 PCUs.

The expressway has reduced the travel time from Kalamboli in Raigad, near Mumbai to Kiwale in Pune to about two hours. It has largely supplemented the Mumbai-Pune section of NH 48, which had become extremely congested and accident-prone.

The expressway is not part of NHAI highway network NH 48 and has been built, operated and maintained wholly by the Government of Maharashtra via Maharashtra State Road Development Corporation. NH 48 is another separate older national highway. The NH 48 merges with this expressway for a short distance near Khandala. Due to the winding route taken as the road climbs up the hills, traffic congestion occurs on that part of the expressway where NH 48 merges. To alleviate this, a 'missing link' (bypass) was constructed and opened in May 2026. This allows traffic to bypass the hill (ghat) section, reducing the distance by about 6 km (3.7 mi) and travel time by an estimated 25 minutes.

== History ==
The government of Maharashtra appointed RITES in 1990 to carry out feasibility studies for the new expressway to be operated on toll basis. RITES submitted its report in 1994 with the estimated cost of the project at ₹11.46 billion (US$120 million).

The government of Maharashtra entrusted the work of the construction of the expressway to MSRDC in March 1997 on Build-Operate-Transfer basis with permission to collect toll for 30 years. The Ministry of Environment and Forests, Government of India gave environmental clearance on 13 October 1997 and forest clearance on 11 November 1997.

The tender notice was published in leading newspapers all over India and also on the Internet. Due to the wide publicity, 133 tenders were sold and 55 tenders were received on 18 December 1997. After technical and financial evaluation, work orders were given on 1 January 1998 to four contractors. Thereafter tenders for widening of Khandala and Lonavala-Khandala bypass works were invited. The tenders were received on 24 August 1998 and orders were issued on 4 September 1998.

This six-lane project was completed under the stewardship of the Maharashtra State Road Development Corporation (MSRDC). The expressway cost ₹16.3 billion (US$170 million) to construct. The first sections opened in 2000, and the entire route was completed, opened to traffic and made fully operational from April 2002.

The expressway was closed for over 24 hours on 26 July 2005, due to heavy monsoon, which caused several landslides. It was not until 2009, however, that speed limits were posted, at 80 km/h (50 mph), after several accidents due to over-speeding were reported.

In June and July 2015, the expressway faced temporary closure for certain times of the day due to landslides caused by heavy rains, which also caused fatalities. As a precautionary measure, the PWD began to remove loose rocks and installed safety nets, while diverting traffic the old National Highway 48.

As the expressway began to suffer from congestions with time, most notably in the incline section near Khandala and Lonavala due to the movement of heavy vehicles, a proposal to construct an alternative road was approved. The construction began in March 2019, which included 2 new tunnels (23 meter wide, and longest tunnel of 8.87 km), and 2 viaducts, one of them cable stayed, and will pass below the lake in Lonavala. During the period, the other sections of the expressway were progressively expanded to 4 lanes from 3 on each side. Originally stated to complete in March 2024, the deadline has been extended to August 2025, and subsequently extended to 2026. The missing link opened on 1 May 2026, coinciding with the Maharashtra Day.

The expressway faced a limited use of vehicles plying in the lockdown during COVID-19, with only emergency and special passes being allowed. During that period, the MSRDC with the help of Maharashtra Police Highway Traffic department, demolished a section of the 190-year-old Amrutanjan Bridge, a popular out of use railway bridge on the Bhor Ghat while preserving the plaque, as it caused a bottleneck for wide trucks and a potential safety hazard. Following the demolition, safety at that section has been greatly improved.

The expressway was closed on the morning of 6 July 2026 at the Missing Link section due to landslides and damage at the cable stayed bridge caused by heavy rains. According the authorities, the carriageway towards Mumbai on the Missing Link was shut down at 4 AM for a few hours to clear the debris and traffic was rerouted towards Lonavala ghat section and old National Highway 48.

== Naming ==
The expressway was conceived in the year 1992 by the Maharashtra state Government, although construction began in 1997. Eventually, in 2009, the then ruling coalition (INC, NCP) named the expressway after the first Chief Minister of Maharashtra, Yashavantrao Chavan, who was a member of the Congress.

== Opening ==
The expressway was opened to the public in April 2002. The expressway initially opened without a posted speed limit. However, in 2009, a speed limit of 80 km/h (50 mph) was enacted as private vehicles got more powerful and could hit higher speeds more easily, although enforcement was lax. In July 2019, a panel of experts agreed to further increase the speed limit to 120 km/h (75 mph). This increase was short lived, and four months later in November 2019, the Highway Police slashed down the speed limit to 100 km/h (62 mph) for cars and 80 km/h (50 mph) for trucks on flat terrain, and 60 km/h (37 mph) as a speed limit for hilly terrain.

== Tunnels and Bridges ==
Tiger Valley Bridge on Mumbai-Pune Expressway

At the opening, the expressway featured a few minor bridges and six illuminated, ventilated tunnels totaling 5,724 metres. These tunnels were built by the Konkan Railway Corporation Ltd. However, with the construction of Missing Link, two more tunnels were added, along with a viaduct and a cable stayed bridge. The Missing Link tunnels were reported to be 23 meters wide and feature 4 lanes, making them one of the widest tunnels worldwide.

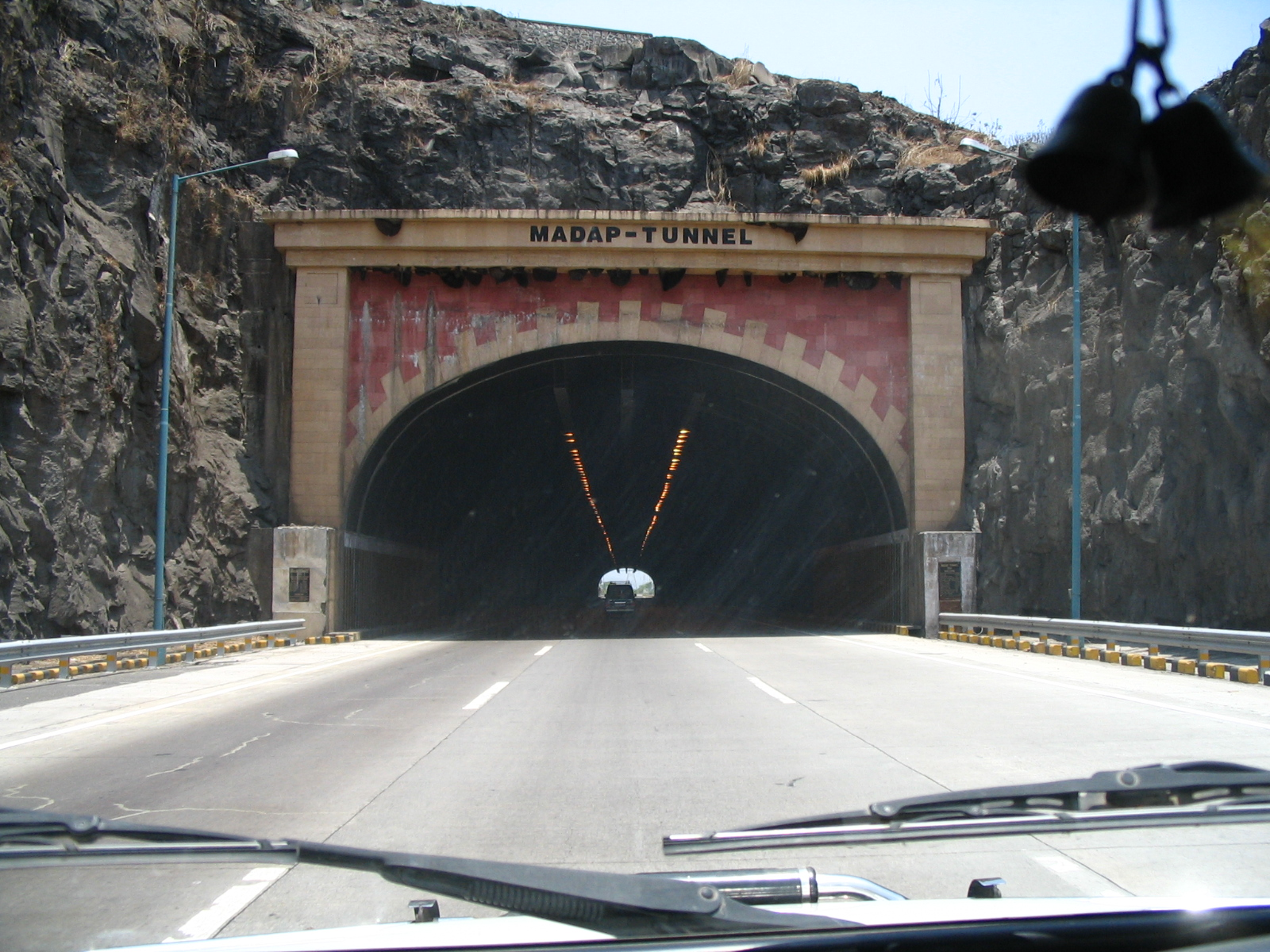
Entrance of the Madap tunnel, in the Pune-Mumbai direction

Tunnels
	Tunnel	Description
1	Bhatan	This tunnel opened in April 2000. The Mumbai-Pune (North) tube is 1,046 m and the Pune-Mumbai (South) tube is 1,086 m long.
2	Madap	This tunnel also opened in April 2000. The Mumbai-Pune (North) tube is 295 m and the Pune-Mumbai (South) tube is 351 m long.
3	Missing Link 1	This tunnel opened in May 2026. Both tubes are 1,680 m long.
4	Missing Link 2	This tunnel also opened in May 2026. Both tubes are 8,870 m long.
5	Adoshi	This tunnel contains only a half part of the expressway which goes from Pune to Mumbai. The Mumbai-Pune carriageway skirts the eastern edge of the tunnel while the Pune-Mumbai carriageway traverses the 230-metre-long (750 ft) tunnel.
6	Khandala	This is a curved pair of tubes. The Mumbai-Pune (North) tube is 320 m and the Pune-Mumbai (South) tube is 360 m long.
7	Kamshet-1	The Mumbai-Pune (North) tube is 935 m and the Pune-Mumbai (South) tube is 972 m long.
8	Kamshet-2	The Mumbai-Pune (North) tube is 191 m and the Pune-Mumbai (South) tube is 168 m long.

Viaducts
	Bridge	Description
1	Viaduct 1	This is the first bridge to bypass Khandala-Lonavala area. The height of the bridge is 50 m and a length of 950 m.
2	Viaduct 2	This is a cable-stayed bridge constructed between the tunnels in Tiger valley. The height of the bridge is 184 m and length of 650 m.

== Distances ==
Distances
	Description	Distance
1	Start of Expressway (Mumbai end) (19°01′11.47″N 73°06′13.21″E) to Kon-Shedung interchange	8.5 km (5.3 mi)
2	Kon-Shedung interchange to Bhatan tunnel	6.3 km (3.9 mi)
3	Bhatan tunnel to Madap tunnel	10.6 km (6.6 mi)
4	Madap tunnel to Khalapur toll station	7.3 km (4.5 mi)
5	Khalapur toll station to Khalapur-Sajgaon gas station & rest area	1.6 km (0.99 mi)
6	Khalapur-Sajgaon rest area to Adoshi tunnel. The Mumbai-Pune carriageway skirts the eastern edge of the tunnel while the Pune-Mumbai carriageway traverses the 230-metre-long (750 ft) tunnel.	6.9 km (4.3 mi)
7	Adoshi tunnel to the Deccan-Konkan stone trestle.	4.5 km (2.8 mi)
8	Stone trestle to Khandala tunnel	0.8 km (0.50 mi)
9	Khandala tunnel to Khandala	2.7 km (1.7 mi)
10	Khandala to Tungarli	3.5 km (2.2 mi)
11	Tungarli to Kamshet-1 tunnel	17.1 km (10.6 mi)
12	Kamshet-1 tunnel to Kamshet-2 tunnel	1.2 km (0.75 mi)
13	Kamshet-2 tunnel to Talegaon toll station	11.1 km (6.9 mi)
14	Talegaon toll station to Somatane interchange	3.4 km (2.1 mi)
15	Somatane interchange to End of Expressway (Pune end) (18°39′45.85″N 73°43′35.61″E)	7.6 km (4.7 mi)
	Total length of Expressway: Start to End	93.1 km (57.8 mi)

== Toll plazas ==
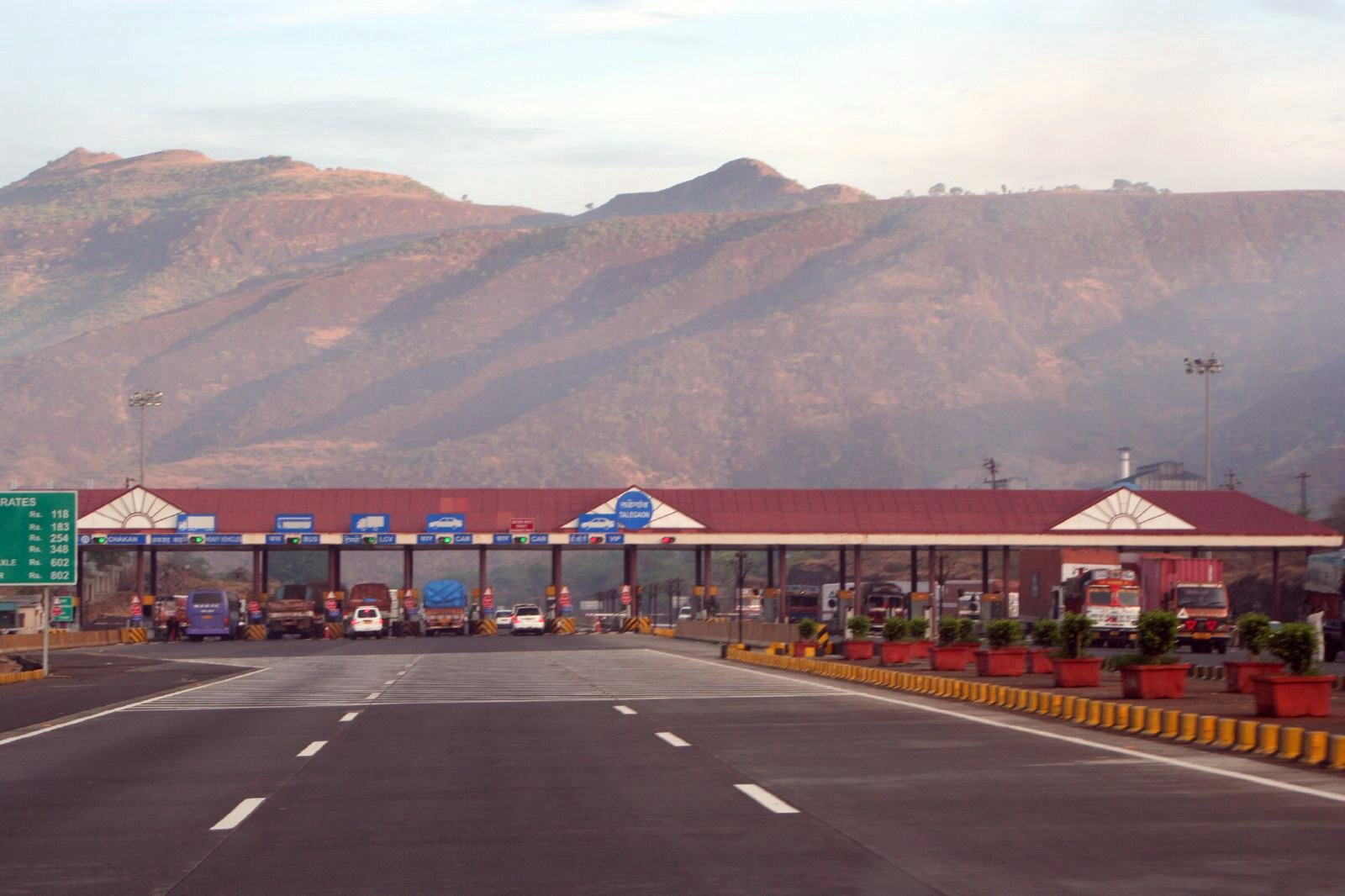
Talegaon Toll Plaza

Toll is collected at Khalapur (Pali Phata) (for the Mumbai-Pune direction) and at Talegaon (Toll Rates 2023) (for the Pune-Mumbai direction). The toll ranges from ₹540 (US$5.60) for private cars, to ₹2,200 (US$23) for multi-axle trailer trucks. The toll collection data is kept as secret as per the RTI inquiry raised by activist Vivek Velankar. The expressway contract with the Ideal Road Builders (IRB) has been uploaded, but the toll collection details are not there. While a toll waiver was planned for the year 2030 after recouping the investment and necessary funds for maintenance, the construction of missing link and the expansion from 6 to 8 lanes necessitated deferment of the waiver.

Upon inauguration of the Missing Link, which connects the exit of Khopoli to Kusgoan (Near Sinhgad Institute), cuts travel time by 30 minutes and distance by 6 km, Maharashtra Deputy Chief Minister Eknath Shinde stated that there will be no increase in toll rates, despite the significant cost of construction at nearly Rs. 67 billion.

== Accidents and incidents ==
The expressway has witnessed a large number of road accidents, attributed to human errors and the large volume of traffic. In the first 10 years since its opening, there were 1,758 accidents with more than 400 fatalities.

- On 28 May 2012, 27 people were reported to have died and another 26 injured in a road accident when a speeding tempo hit a stationary bus carrying passengers near Khalapur.
- On 10 June 2010, at least 10 people were injured and 30 vehicles were damaged in a pileup near Kamshet, which occurred when a MSRTC bus skidded inside a tunnel.

The expressway faced its first closure on 26 July 2005, due to heavy monsoon, which caused several landslides. During that time, several vehicles were stranded, while law enforcement worked extensively to clear the carriageways of landslide debris.

The heavy rains in June and July 2015 caused heavy landslides at Khandala and Adoshi tunnels, which prompted the PWD to remove loose rocks to prevent further landslides. To carry out such works, the expressway near to the Lonavala exit till Khopoli exit was closed from 10 am to 5 pm for 10 days after the landslide near Adoshi tunnel on 18 July 2015 which took three lives and halted the traffic for two months. The boulders fell on both carriageways which caused huge diversion of traffic towards the old highway.

Sporadic instances of robbery have been reported on the highway.

In 2016, the SaveLIFE Foundation, a nonprofit NGO, with support from Mahindra & Mahindra Ltd. and the MSRDC, initiated the 'Zero Fatality Corridor' project to make the expressway fatality-free by 2020. Since August 2016, over a thousand engineering errors on the expressway have been fixed. As a part of this project, the 'Safety Under 80' campaign was also jointly launched by SLF, MSRDC and Mahindra & Mahindra Ltd. The initiative aimed at creating mass awareness on the dangers of speeding and the consequences of speeding were exhibited through outdoor hoardings and installation of crashed cars on both the corridors of the expressway.

On 6 April 2020, during the lockdown during COVID-19 in India, a section of the 190-year-old Amrutanjan Bridge, a popular out of use railway bridge on the Bhor Ghat, was demolished by the MSRDC with the help of Maharashtra Police Highway Traffic department. The bridge was a major bottleneck on the ghat section, which caused traffic snarls, accidents, and posed a safety issue for wide vehicles and trucks carrying wide goods. Cars were stopped at the Anda Point and were made to turn onto the old Khandala road, and then re-enter the expressway. This occurred for a week after the demolition even. Post demolition, the safety and flow of traffic through the ghat section has improved.

On 13 June 2023, an oil tanker overturned on the Mumbai-Pune expressway and rammed against a divider on a bridge near Lonavala which went up in flames on impact, killing the driver and other three people and three were injured.

In October 2023, Enhancing safety on the Mumbai-Pune Expressway, the Maharashtra State Road Development Corporation (MSRDC) had announced the installation of Highway Traffic Management System (HTMS) Gantries on the Yashwantrao Chavan Expressway.

In December 2024, the traffic law enforcement installed use of AI-based cameras to track offenses like speeding, lane indiscipline, dangerous driving, seatbelt violations, amongst other offenses, besides alerting traffic officers for unauthorized entry of prohibited vehicles.

On February 4, 2026, an oil tanker overturned, causing the expressway to be shut down for 30 hours until the oil tanker was towed away.

Notable deaths

- 12 February 2001 - Bhakti Barve, Marathi actress
- 23 December 2012 - Anand Abhyankar & Akshay Pendse Marathi actor

Notable injuries

- 2 April 2022 - Malaika Arora, Hindi actress

== Future expansion ==
MSRDC is planning to widen the expressway from current 6 lane to 8 lane. The proposal has been presented in Maharashtra Cabinet for approval. After this road will connect to central Pune. This will help to all kind of transport like Mumbai to Pune cabs, Buses, and other travellers.

A new Chirle-Bhatanpada corridor or Atal Setu Connector is underconstruction for bypassing Navi Mumbai traffic.

== See also ==
- Expressways in India
- Amritsar–Jamnagar Expressway
- Delhi–Mumbai Expressway
- Pune–Bengaluru Expressway
