= YMCA International Camp, Nilshi, India =

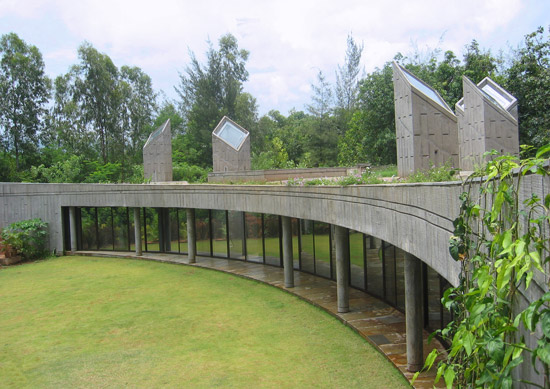
Camp Managers Bungalow at YMCA Camp Site at Nilshi

YMCA Camp Lakeside is located at village Nilshi, in the Western Ghats (mountains) between Mumbai and Pune, India. The campsite is run by the YMCA of Bombay.

== Design ==
The complex was designed by Pune-based Master Architect Prof.Christopher Charles Benninger. His team included architects Deepak Guggari and Harsh Manrao.
