= Savera Hotel =

Hotel in Chennai, India

The Savera

General information
- Location: India, 146, Dr. Radhakrishnan Salai, Mylapore; Chennai, Tamil Nadu 600 004
- Coordinates: 13°2′46″N 80°15′40″E
- Opening: 1969
- Owner: Savera Enterprises Limited (SEL)

Height
- Height: 46.03 m (151.0 ft)

Technical details
- Floor count: 11

Other information
- Number of rooms: 230
- Number of restaurants: 4

Website
- saverahotel.com

The Savera is an 11-storied four-star hotel located in Mylapore, Chennai, India.

== History ==
The hotel was started as a partnership firm in 1965, when its promoters, A. Venkatakrishna Reddy, M. Ramaraghava Reddy and A. Shyamasundara Reddy, with considerable experience in the real estate and hotel business, acquired land measuring approximately 5,000 square metres in Mylapore, a prime locality in the city, to build a hotel with 20 rooms and a restaurant. In 1969, the promoters established a company under the name 'Savera Hotels Private Limited' to meet the needs of their growing business. In 1971, the partnership concern sold 1,757 square metres of its land to Savera Hotels Private Limited, which subsequently also acquired 4,684 square metres of land around the original hotel. In 1972, when the company started operations, 125 rooms were added to the hotel and the original 20 rooms were converted to build the hotel office and conference rooms. Accessories like the swimming pool were already constructed, an idea which was not common with the hotel industry in the city then. In 1975, Minar Restaurant, an exclusive restaurant serving Moghlai food, was opened.

In 1978, Pallavi Theatre, an auditorium with audio-visual facilities and a 35-mm projector was commissioned. In 1982, closed circuit television sets were provided in all the 125 rooms of the hotel. A completely renovated permit room called Bamboo Bar was shifted from the basement to the ground floor in 1985. With the trend shifting from the use of auditoriums to compact conference halls, the Pallavi Theater was completely renovated and converted into a conference hall in 1991. In 1992, Sweet Touch, a pastry shop was started.

The partnership concern and the company existed concurrently until 1985, when the partnership was dissolved and Savera Enterprises Limited took over all the assets of the partnership concern. In 2007, the company changed its name from Savera Hotels Ltd to Savera Industries Ltd.

== The hotel ==
The hotel features eight food and beverage venues, including, the multi-cuisine restaurant named The Piano, a South Indian restaurant named Malgudi, a rooftop North Indian restaurant named Curry Town, a restaurant lounge named Bay 146, a bar longue named Bamboo Bar, a garden coffee house named Brew Room, and a cake shop named Baker's Basket. The hotel has 10 meeting venues.

The hotel has a corporate social responsibility entity named Savera Hotel Academy established to guide students towards a career in hospitality industry.

== Incidents ==
On 31 December 2007, a makeshift dance floor erected above the swimming pool, for the New Year Eve, collapsed killing three persons and injuring two.

== See also ==
- Hotels in Chennai
- List of tallest buildings in Chennai
