= Pune–Bengaluru Expressway =

Expressways in Maharashtra and Karnataka

Route information
- Length: 700 km (430 mi)

Major junctions
- North end: Pune
- South end: Bengaluru

Location
- Country: India

Highway system
- Roads in India; Expressways; National; State; Asian

Pune–Bengaluru Expressway is a planned 700 km long, 8 lane, Greenfield access-controlled expressway in Maharashtra and Karnataka. It is to be part of Bharatmala Pariyojana. The expressway will pass through 12 districts, of which three are in Maharashtra and nine are in Karnataka. It connects Pune with Bengaluru. The Bengaluru-Pune Expressway will reduce the distance between the two cities by about 95 km. It is estimated that time to drive from Bengaluru to Pune will reduce from the current 15 hours to 7 hours after the completion of this expressway. At Pune, the expressway will also connect with the Pune–Mumbai Expressway. It is reported that the expressway is targeted to be completed by 2028.

This greenfield expressway under Bharatmala Pariyojna Phase 2 will run parallel to National Highway 48. Also, the Greenfield Expressway will serve as an alternative and faster route to the NH-48.

The proposed expressway, under Phase-II of the Prime Minister's flagship Bharatmala project, is estimated to be developed at a cost of Rs ₹50,000 crore.

== Route ==
=== Maharashtra ===
In Maharashtra, this expressway starts on the Pune Outer Ring Road in Pune Metropolitan Region. It crosses Pune district, Satara district, Sangli district in Maharashtra, and enters the state of Karnataka.

=== Karnataka ===
In Karnataka, this expressway enters Vijayapura district and crosses Bagalkote district, Gadag district, Koppal district, Vijayanagara district, Davanagere district, Chitradurga district, Tumakuru district and Bengaluru North district. The expressway ends at Bengaluru Satellite Town Ring Road in Bengaluru Metropolitran Region.

== See also ==
- Expressways in India
