= Paud =

Village in Maharashtra

- village
- Location in Maharashtra, India Paud (India)
- Coordinates: 18°31′27″N 73°36′57″E
- Country: India
- State: Maharashtra
- District: Pune

Population
  - Total: 5,558

Languages
  - Official: Marathi
- Time zone: UTC+5:30 (IST)
- Vehicle registration: MH-12, MH-14
- Nearest city: Pune

Paud is a small village in the heart of the Mulshi valley in Pune district, the fourth most populous district in India. It is located in the state of Maharashtra. The main sources of income are the two international schools on the nearby hills: Riverdale International School, and Mahindra United World College of India. Within the village itself, there are a few mechanics, sweet shops, 3 banks, and restaurant (Sagar Inn) with permit room. There is also a bus stop cum jeep stand with access to Pune. The region is an eco-tourism hotspot, and outside of town there are many guest houses and gardens. This also has caught eyes of Realtors, trying to develop the area into an out-state nature living spot. The biggest development here is Skyi Star Town, a complete satellite township being developed in the area. The move has bought a new source of revenue for the locals, who comprise as the main source of workforce for construction, as well as logistics.

Sagar Inn blossomed with the founding of the Mahindra United World College of India. Students frequently visit the restaurant. There is also a picturesque historic Church in the valley which belonged to The Church of Scotland during the British era. Now it is under the jurisdiction of the Church of North India. There are some other villages near Paud such as Asade, Bhadas, Shileshwar, Jamgaon, Shere, Akole, Mulshi and many others, that make up Taluka Mulshi, of which Paud is the taluka seat. This area is largely dependent on agriculture and manual labour.

== Transport ==
PMPML bus services are available from Paud to Pune Railway Station, Marketyard, and Chinchwad Gaon. ST bus services are also available from Paud to Pune and Pimpri-Chinchwad, as well as Mangaon, Mahad, Dapoli and Roha areas.

== See also ==
- Arun Paudwal
  - Anuradha Paudwal
  - Kavita Paudwal
