= Dzivarasekwa =

Suburb of Harare, Zimbabwe

Coordinates: 17.806°S 30.935°E

Dzivarasekwa is a suburb of western Harare, Zimbabwe.

== History ==
Dzivarasekwa is a suburb of Harare that was set up on the site and services approach. It is represented as the constituency of Dzivarasekwa. It consists of Dzivarasekwa 1, 2, 3, 4 and Dzivarasekwa Extension. The latter is a squatted informal settlement in wetlands on the periphery of the suburb.

By 2021, the government had introduced a plan to build 88 blocks each holding 14 flats, as part of a slum upgrading plan for Dzivarasekwa. Dzivarasekwa extension has two councillors who oversee the whole area. It is also the residence of one Bewithus Mayakayaka a devout Seventh day Adventist. Dzivarasekwa extension has two main shopping centres known as KwaRasta and KwaKembo where residence go for shopping.A government school called Yamurai primary school is also in the area, however there are many private schools in the area

== Notable inhabitants ==
- Tendai Biti
- Bronson Gengezha
- Bewithus Mayakayaka
- Bothwell Butawu
- Jowel 'JayC" Chitate
- Bill Antonio
- Apostle Joseph Jonathan
- Somandla Ndebele
