= Arvinn Gadgil =

Norwegian politician

Arvinn Eikeland Gadgil

State Secretary (International Development Affairs), Ministry of Foreign Affairs
- In office 13 April 2012 – 16 October 2013
- Prime Minister: Jens Stoltenberg

Personal details
- Born: 18 January 1980 (age 46) Tromsø, Norway
- Party: Socialist Left Party
- Education: University of Warwick; London School of Economics and Political Science
- Profession: Politician

Arvinn Eikeland Gadgil (born 18 January 1980, Tromsø, Norway) is a Norwegian Socialist Left Party politician. He was the State Secretary (International Development Affairs) of the Ministry of Foreign Affairs from April 2012 until the Norwegian general election of September 2013.

His appointment was seen by the world as the first effort by the Norwegian government to reach out to the immigrant population in Norway after the Anders Breivik attack. Notably, Gadgil's grandfather sat on the inaugural Board of Directors of Air India, India's flag carrier airline.

== Early life and education ==
Gadgil's father Arun Kumar Keshavrao Gadgil is a first-generation Indian immigrant of Maharashtrian descent and his mother Inger Eikeland is Norwegian. Gadgil considers himself to be Maharashtrian.

Gadgil completed his International Baccalaureate from Mahindra United World College of India between 1997 and 1999, where 94 of the 100 students in the school were of different nationalities. Subsequently, he attained Examen philosophicum from University of Tromsø in the spring of 2000. He enrolled for his BSc in Economics and International Studies course at the University of Warwick, spending three years from 2000 to 2003. Later, he earned his Masters in Development Studies and Economics from London School of Economics and Political Science with distinction and first class honours.

== Political career ==
=== Early activism ===
Gadgil's early involvement with activism was when Shiv Sena opposed his international school in Pune. He was actively involved in protesting to restore electricity and water supply cut by the government to his school.

=== Student involvement ===
During his time at the University of Warwick, he was the Coordinator of the One World Week and Chairman of the International Committee. At the London School of Economics and Political Science, he was the Student representative for the Institute for Development Studies. From 2006 to 2008, he was the Member of United World Colleges National Committee, Norway.

=== Formal career ===
From the autumn of 2006 to 2007, he was a Foreign Service Trainee, working in the Afghanistan team of the South Asia section. In the autumn of 2007, he became a Foreign Service Trainee and Personal Assistant to Political Director Kai Eide. From June 2008, he was a Political Advisor in the Ministry of the Environment and Ministry of Foreign Affairs, assisting Erik Solheim. He was retained as a Political Advisor in the Ministry of Foreign Affairs until October 2012. Since 2007, he is a prominent member of the International Committee of the Socialist Left Party.

=== Social contribution ===
Gadgil has actively contributed to the Norwegian NGO Development Fund Norway, serving as an Information Officer for civilian national service and an Executive Officer for Sri Lanka. He was briefly involved in teaching students with special needs.

== Personal life ==
Gadgil has a registered partner.
