= Social access =

Delivery of public services to user groups

Social access is a concept of the delivery of public services, facilities and amenities to intended user groups. Limited access may be due to their high cost, the lack of appropriate infrastructure or due to prejudices within the society that restrict use. Urban policy makers plan for universal access to potable water, sewerage disposal, solid waste disposal, medical aid and education. Policies may assume that the private sector delivers some or a part of these requirements. The actual "reach" of these systems is usually far less than required. This is particularly a concern in emerging, rapidly urbanizing societies.

Often a city has large sources of raw water, adequate purification facilities, and extensive trunk infrastructure bringing potable water into wards of the urban area, but appropriate user-end infrastructure like public taps, restrooms, and bathing places do not exist. The smallest residential plot allowed by urban planning standards may be too expensive, when priced by current market rates, for intended low income users to purchase. The building regulations may necessitate unaffordable standards of construction. The urban development control rules may add to the expenses which price shelter out of the reach of large urban markets. Social restrictions may act as barriers to ethnic groups, genders and minority communities. Social access is a concern to poverty alleviation and enhancing the living conditions of the urban poor.

Social access is central to the principles of intelligent urbanism that espouse social and economic opportunity as one of their basic axioms.

== See also ==
- Urban vitality
