= Center for Development Studies and Activities =

Coordinates: 18.505646°N 73.771219°E

Centre for Development Studies and Activities
- Established: 1976
- Founders: Christopher Benninger, Aneeta Gokhale Benninger
- Affiliation: Savitribai Phule Pune University
- Location: Pune, Maharashtra, India
- Campus: Urban
- Website: https://cdsaindia.org/

The Center for Development Studies and Activities, (CDSA), is a research and post graduate teaching institution located in Pune, India. Founded by the architect and urban planner Christopher Charles Benninger and geographer and sustainable development planner Aneeta Gokhale Benninger in 1976, the institute became known for its pioneering work in decentralised planning, micro-level planning, and watershed management. The institute has carried out policy analysis for the World Bank, United Nations, various central ministries of the Government of India, the Government of Sri Lanka, the Royal Government of Bhutan, the Asian Development Bank and various countries in Asia.

The Institute offers a master's degree in Development Planning and Administration, a Masters of Science in Development Planning and Administration and programs leading to the Doctorate in Philosophy. The Institute is affiliated with the University of Pune, the Indian Council of Social Science Research, and other research organizations. The CDSA is located on a 15-acre (61,000 m^{2}) campus, designed by the founder director, which is widely published as an example of Critical Regionalism.

== Institutional Overview ==
The Centre for Development Studies and Activities (CDSA), Pune has a record of accomplishment of 37 years of outstanding performance in the field of Sustainable Development policy and planning, which emphasize decentralized, micro level, participatory decision-making through formal and non-formal local institutional mechanisms. CDSA enables human resource development and human development by imparting state of the art education and training in the globally significant fields of sustainable development, micro and multi-level planning and development informatics.

CDSA promotes action in these areas through its subsidiary institutions: Institute for Sustainable Development (ISD), The School of Development Planning (SDP) (Recognised by UGC and affiliated to the University of Pune), Barbara Ward Library and Documentation Centre (BWLDC), Wasteland Development Demonstration Project (WDDP), Executive Training Centre and Hostel (ETCH). CDSA’s clients include the National Government and State Governments of Maharashtra, Goa, Karnataka, Andhra Pradesh, Kerala, Orissa, Madhya Pradesh, Rajasthan, Himachal Pradesh, Uttar Pradesh, Bihar, West Bengal, Assam, Arunachal Pradesh, Manipur and Gujarat. The bi-lateral and multilateral agencies for which CDSA has successfully carried out projects include DFID, HIVOS, NOVIB, CEBEMO, World Bank, Asian Development Bank, and UNICEF, WHO, UNDP, FAO, ESCAP, UNCHS (HABITAT) from the UN system.

== Related links ==
- Official Website
