= Site and services =

Site and services is an approach to bringing shelter within the economic reach of the poor.

== History ==
Recognizing that the vast majority of low income families in the world build their own shelter, which lacks basic hygiene, access and electricity, the strategy was developed. The approach first appeared on a large scale in Madras (now Chennai) in 1972 when the World Bank engaged Christopher Charles Benninger to advise the Madras Metropolitan Development Authority (MMDA) on their housing sector investments. The approach links the user group's ability to pay with land prices and the costs of rudimentary and upgradable infrastructure. The fundamental idea is to market plots with essential infrastructure at market prices, to avoid the resale of subsidized housing, directed at low-income groups. The first major scheme planned by Benninger, at Arambakkam in Chennai, created about 7,000 shelter units, within the paying capacity of the urban poor. Within five years the MMDA created more than 20,000 units and the approach became a major strategy of the World Bank to tackle a variety of shelter problems globally.

Dzivarasekwa and Kuwadzana are two suburbs of Harare in Zimbabwe set up on the site and services model.
