= Cities (journal) =

- Discipline: Urban planning
- Language: English
- Edited by: A. Modarres

Publication details
- History: 1983–present
- Publisher: Elsevier
- Frequency: Bimonthly
- Impact factor: 6.0 (2023)

Standard abbreviations
- ISO 4: Cities

Indexing
- ISSN: 0264-2751
- LCCN: 84644041
- OCLC no.: 797719791

Links
- Journal homepage; Online archive

Cities is a bimonthly peer-reviewed academic journal. It was founded in 1983 at Butterworths Scientific and is currently being published by Elsevier. It focuses on analysis and assessment of current and historical urban development and management resulting from urban planning policies, while researching solutions in the form of more effective urban policy implementations. Coverage includes developed and developing nations. The editor-in-chief is Pengjun Zhao (Peking University).

== Abstracting and indexing ==
- Current Contents/Social & Behavioral Sciences
- Chemical Abstracts Service
- Geographical Abstracts
- Scopus
- Social Sciences Citation Index
- Sociological Abstracts

According to the Journal Citation Reports, the journal has a 2023 impact factor of 6.0.
