= UWC Mahindra =

Mahindra United World College of India (MUWCI)

Location
- Village Khubawali, PO Paud; Pune, Maharashtra, 412108; India; 18°32′29″N 73°35′09″E

Information
- Other names: UWC Mahindra College; UWC Mahindra
- Type: Independent, boarding school
- Motto: UWC makes education a force to unite people, nations and cultures for peace and a sustainable future
- Established: November 1997; 28 years ago
- Founder: Harish Mahindra
- Oversight: United World Colleges
- Chairman: Keshub Mahindra
- Head of College: Mr. Gaurav Chopra
- Faculty: 27
- Gender: Co-educational
- Enrollment: 240 (boarding)
- Student to teacher ratio: 8:1
- Campus size: 175 acres (0.71 km^{2})
- Campus type: Rural
- Colors: Blue and teal
- National ranking: AAAAA, 1# Boarding School in Maharashtra
- Newspaper: Hill Dweller
- School fees: USD 39,750 for international students and INR 27,30,000 for Indian Nationals (per year, 2025-2026).
- Affiliation: International Baccalaureate
- Website: www.uwcmahindracollege.org

The Mahindra United World College of India (MUWCI, also referred to as UWC Mahindra College or simply UWC Mahindra) is a pre-university international boarding school, located 40 km (25 mi) west of Pune in Maharashtra, India. The college is a two-year programme with about 240 full-time boarders from around 70 countries, and follows the International Baccalaureate Diploma Program (IBDP).

It is one of the 18 United World Colleges, and the only one in South Asia. The school was established in November 1997 with the support of Harish Mahindra and Anand Mahindra of the Mahindra Group.

== History ==
On 28 November 1997, Queen Noor of Jordan and Nelson Mandela inaugurated the UWC Mahindra College in India. The opening of the school was made possible by a donation of land and building infrastructure by Harish Mahindra, of the Mahindra Group. The company and several members of the family remain involved with the college, with Anand Mahindra serving as chair of the college, and the company continuing to fund student scholarships.

== Campus ==
The Mahindra United World College of India is one of eighteen campuses under the United World College banner. The campus was designed by architect Christopher Charles Benninger, and is divided into a residential and an academic area. The design incorporates traditional elements and local building materials. Benninger paid homage to traditional Indian architecture by incorporating elements such as wadas, staggered steps, and lotus ponds.

The college is located near the village of Paud in the Taluka Mulshi region of the western state of Maharashtra, India. It is around 40 km (25 mi) from the city of Pune (which, in turn, is around 100 km (62 mi) south-east of Mumbai). The MUWCI campus is situated on a hill surrounded by rural communities and overlooking the valley of the Mula river near Mulshi Dam.

The residential side of campus is divided into communal clusters called "Wadas". The Wadas house between 40 and 60 students and 4-6 teachers and families. Students live in independent houses of eight students each, with communal courtyards. Teachers also serve as 'Wada parents' (house parents), providing a supportive residential and learning context.

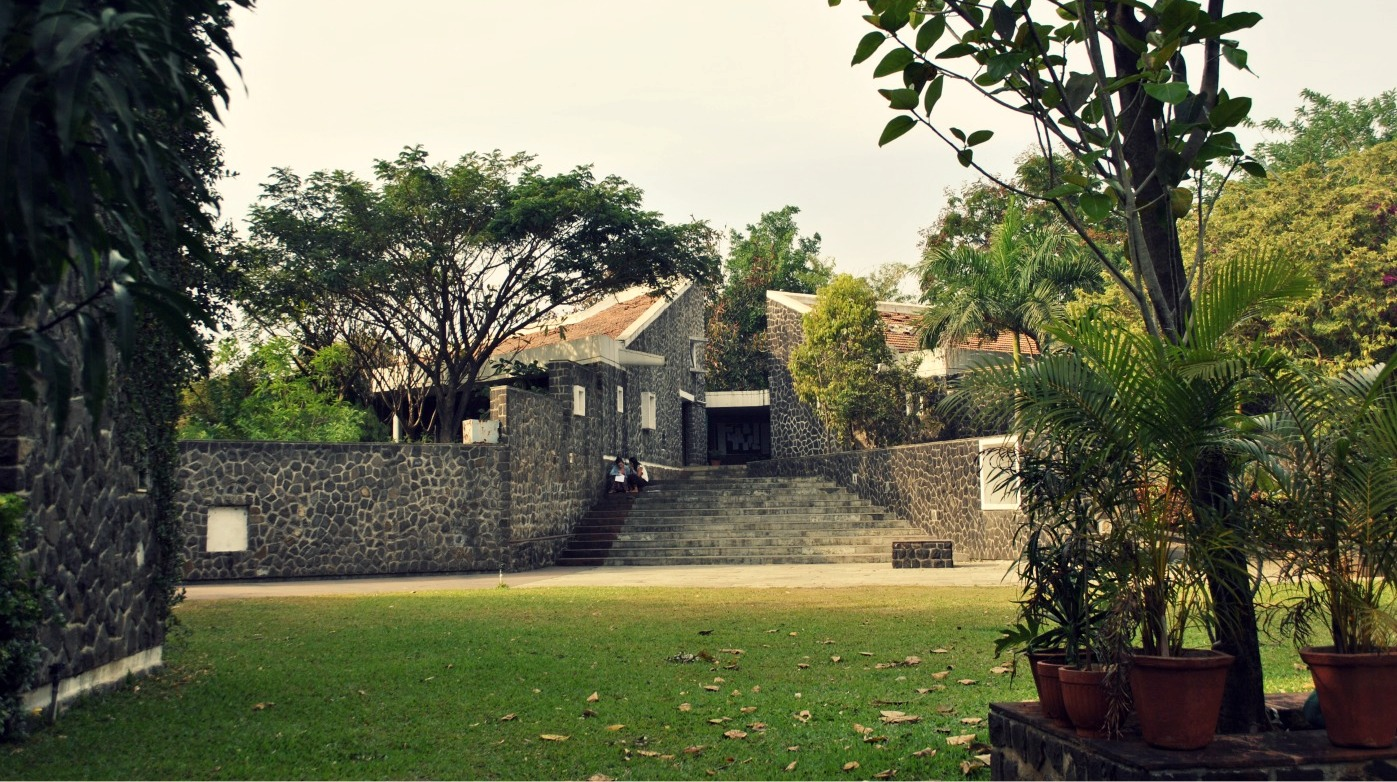
View of one of the staircases leading to the main academic quadrangle.

== Academics ==
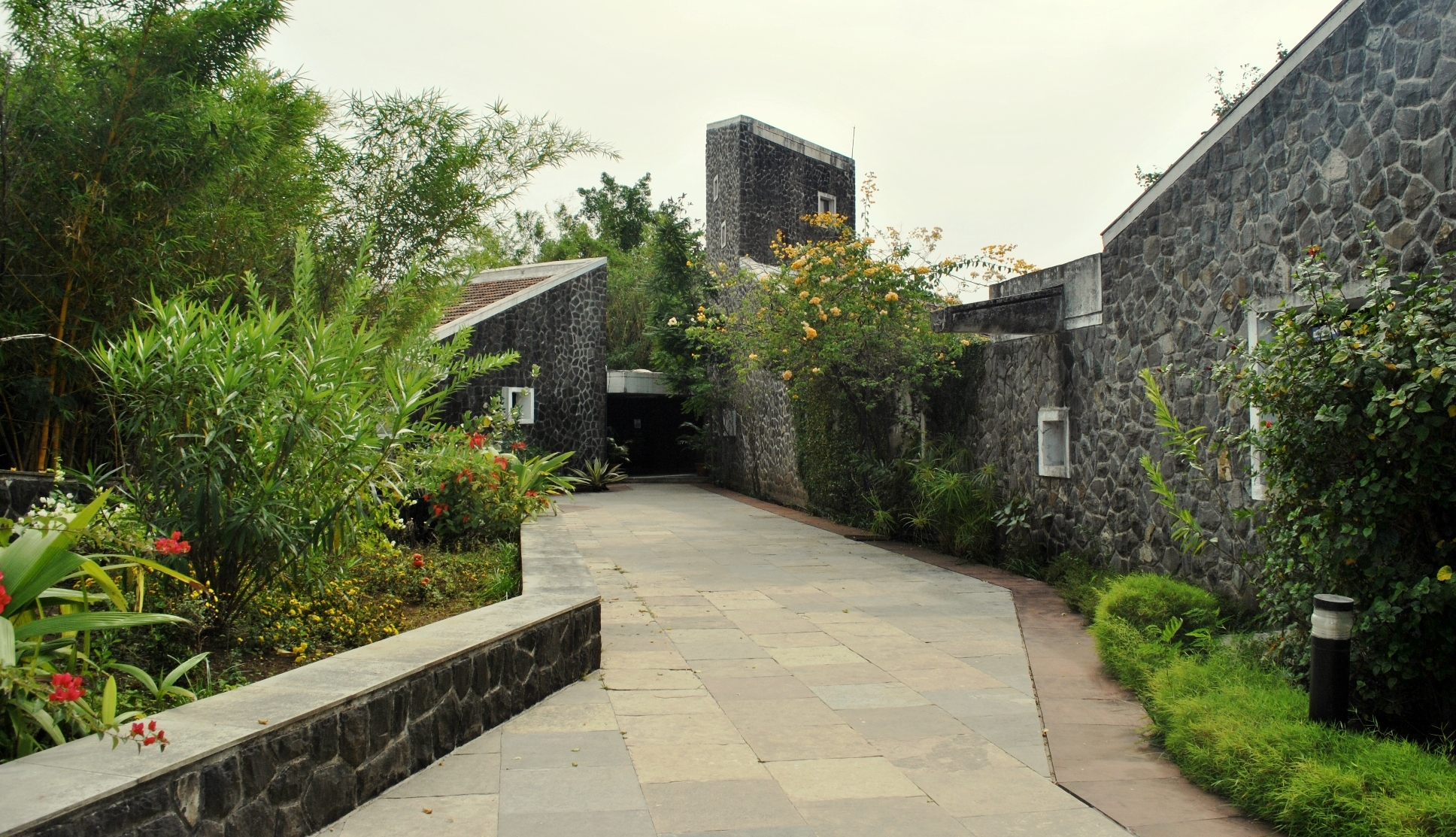
A view of the academic area

UWC Mahindra College offers the International Baccalaureate Diploma Programme. Students can also choose to do the UWC Mahindra College Project Based Diploma by pursuing a research project during their two years of study.

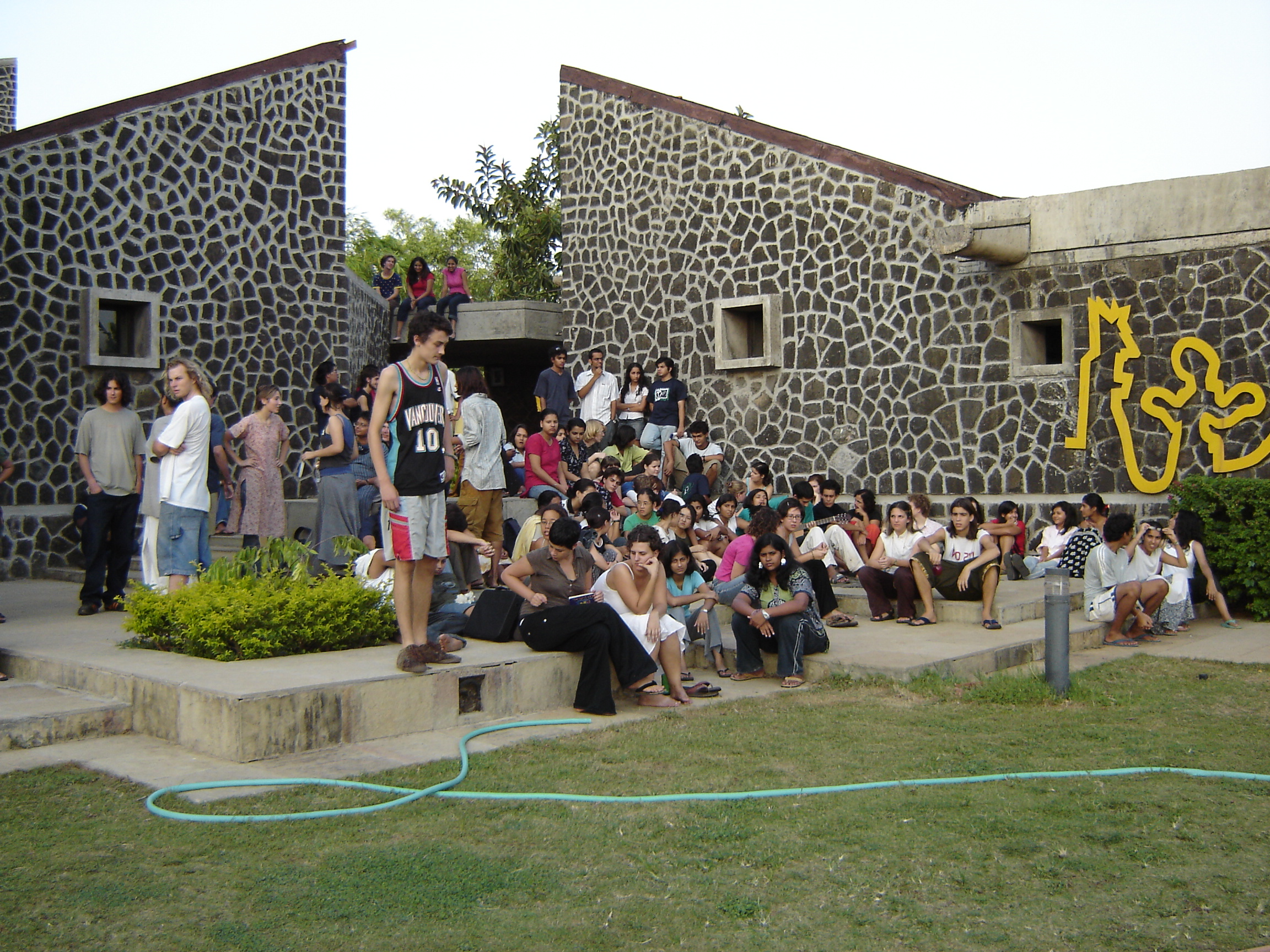
College Meeting, May 2005

The following IB subjects are available at MUWCI, though offerings may change slightly year to year:

- Group 1: The Students' Best Language - English Literature (HL/SL), English Language And Literature (HL/SL), Spanish Literature (HL/SL), Hindi Literature (SL), Self-Taught Literature (SL)
- Group 2: Modern Language Acquisition - English B (HL), Spanish B (HL/SL), Spanish ab initio (SL), French B (HL/SL), French ab initio (SL)
- Group 3: Individuals and Societies - Psychology (HL/SL), Philosophy (HL/SL), Global Politics (HL/SL), History (HL/SL), Economics (HL/SL), Environmental Systems and Societies (SL)
- Group 4: Experimental Sciences - Physics (HL/SL), Chemistry (HL/SL), Biology (HL/SL), Environmental Systems and Societies (SL), Computer Science (HL/SL).
- Group 5: Mathematics - Analysis & Approaches (HL/SL), Applications & Interpretations (HL/SL)
- Group 6: The Arts - Visual Arts (HL/SL), Film Studies (HL/SL), Theater (HL/SL).

Apart from formal subjects, the experiential learning programme (known as Triveni at MUWCI) forms a significant part of the students' education. Triveni in Hindi means confluence of three rivers. Triveni is formed of three streams - (i) the IB CAS (Creativity, Action & Service) programme, (ii) Project & Travel Weeks (iii) a rich on-campus seminar and discussion series including This Is India, Global Affairs, guest speakers and more.

== Students ==
Students in UWC Mahindra College represent many different nationalities. The Class of 2018 represented 57 countries. The inaugural class comprised 91 students from around the world.

== Admission ==
Most students are nominated to attend UWC Mahindra College via their UWC National Committees. Indian students, residents and PIO/OCI students can apply via the United World College Committee of India. The selection process is rigorous, with an acceptance rate of 1.5%. The application process for Indian students starts in August and are finalized by March. The candidates are shortlisted based on potential to demonstrate UWC values and academic merit. Shortlisted candidates are invited to a selection camp held at the MUWCI campus near Pune. During the camp, various activities are conducted including panel interviews, Group Discussions, Object-Presentation and various written and computer based tests. Based on the students' performance the committee nominates students to Mahindra UWC or any of the other United World Colleges.

== Administration ==
The founding Head of college, David Wilkinson, moved to Pune at the inception of UWC Mahindra College in 1997, having previously been the founding head of the Li Po Chun United World College in Hong Kong. In 2009, Jonathan Long was appointed as Head of college and remained until 2011, when Pelham Lindfield Roberts joined, having previously taught at UWC Atlantic and been head of school at Schule Schloss Salem, another Kurt Hahn associated school. Soraya Sayed Hassen took on the role of Head of College in 2018, after Pelham Lindfield Roberts was appointed principal at UWC Changshu China. In July 2021, Dr. Dale Taylor took the role of Head of College. In July 2022, Gaurav Chopra stepped in as Interim Head of College, a role he took on a permanent basis in February 2023.

== Notable alumni ==
- Arvinn Gadgil, '99
- Valeria Luiselli
- Malaika Vaz, '15
