= Delos Symposium =

Ekistics Forum

The Delos Symposion was a forum for discussion and debate over issues of Ekistics, or the study of human settlements, in its widest sense.

The Symposium was organized by the Greek architect-planner, Constantinos A. Doxiadis in the Aegean Sea, on board, and was held each July from 1963 through 1975, lasting about ten days. The proceedings were published in Ekistics Journal. Each year, prior to the Symposium, the Athens Ekistic Week was held, involving the Symposium participants in a larger meeting.

== Idea development ==
Ideas incubated and mooted at the Symposium, such as the Habitat Forum were subsequently transformed into institutions, and United Nations programs. Each senior expert was asked to invite a young protégé, bringing youthful ideas and variety into the gathering.

== Notable attendees ==
- Barbara Ward (economist)
- Margaret Mead (anthropologist)
- Buckminster Fuller (technologist)
- Arnold Toynbee (historian)
- Edmund Bacon (urban designer)
- Vikram Sarabhai (scientist)
- Marshall McLuhan (philosopher and public intellectual)
- Conrad Waddington (geneticist)
- Richard L. Meier (urban planner)
- Jaqueline Tyrwhitt (architect)
- Kenzō Tange (architect)
- Sigfried Giedion (historian)
- Fumihiko Maki (architect)
- Walter Christaller (geographer)
- Grady Clay (journalist)
- W.W. Rostow (economist)
- Whitney Young (human rights activist)
- Jonas Salk (scientist)
- Alexander Christakis (physicist)
- Lawrence Halprin (landscape architect)
