= Kamshet =

- region
- Location in Maharashtra, India
- Coordinates: 18.763°N 73.557°E
- Country: India
- State: Maharashtra
- District: Pune
- Taluka: Maval
- Elevation: 670 m (2,200 ft)

Languages
  - Official: Marathi
  - Other: hindi
- Time zone: UTC+5:30 (IST)
- Postal code: 410405

Kamshet is a region located in Pune district in the state of Maharashtra, India, 110 km from Mumbai City, and 45 km from Pune in Pune district. It is 16 km from the twin hill stations of Khandala and Lonavala and is accessible by road and rail from Mumbai (Bombay) and Pune. Kamshet is home to small villages that are built in the traditional style - with mud, thatch and reeds.

== Transport ==
Kamshet railway station is located in the Western Ghats, off an ancient trade-route that once linked the west coast to the hinterland. The railway station runs parallel to the Indrayani River. The hills along this route are dotted with ancient cave temples, medieval hill fortresses and colonial hill stations. Kamshet serves as a railhead for many villages (such as Bhaja, Uksan and Kamra) in the western ghats. A regular MSRTC bus runs from Kamshet to these villages.

== Climate ==
Kamshet has a hot semi-arid climate (Köppen BSh) bordering a tropical savanna climate (Aw) and average temperatures ranging between 20 and 26 °C (68 and 79 °F). Kamshet experiences three seasons: summer, monsoon and a winter.

Typical summer months are from March to May, with maximum temperatures ranging from 28 to 36 °C (82 to 97 °F). The warmest month in Pune is April; although summer doesn't end until May, the city often receives very heavy thundershowers in May (and humidity remains high). Even during the hottest months, the nights are usually cool due to Kamshet's high altitude. The highest temperature ever recorded was 42.3 °C (108.1 °F) on 30 April 1897.

The monsoon lasts from June to October, with moderate rainfall and temperatures ranging from 21 to 27 °C (70 to 81 °F). Most of the 722 mm (28.43 in) of annual rainfall in the city fall between June and September, and July is the wettest month of the year. Hailstorms are also common in this region.

Winter begins in November; November in particular is referred to as the Rosy Cold (literal translation) (Marathi: गुलाबी थंडी). The daytime temperature hovers around 28 °C (82 °F) while night temperature is below 10 °C (50 °F) for most of December and January, often dropping to 5 to 6 °C (41 to 43 °F). The lowest temperature ever recorded was 1.7 °C (35 °F) on 17 January 1935.

Climate data for Kamshet
Month	Jan	Feb	Mar	Apr	May	Jun	Jul	Aug	Sep	Oct	Nov	Dec	Year
Record high °C (°F)	32.6 (90.7)	35.3 (95.5)	39.8 (103.6)	42.3 (108.1)	41.7 (107.1)	39.8 (103.6)	33.7 (92.7)	31.6 (88.9)	35.3 (95.5)	36.7 (98.1)	34.0 (93.2)	32.8 (91.0)	42.3 (108.1)
Mean daily maximum °C (°F)	29.9 (85.8)	31.9 (89.4)	35.4 (95.7)	37.7 (99.9)	36.9 (98.4)	31.7 (89.1)	28.4 (83.1)	27.4 (81.3)	29.4 (84.9)	31.4 (88.5)	30.1 (86.2)	28.9 (84.0)	31.6 (88.9)
Daily mean °C (°F)	20.5 (68.9)	22.0 (71.6)	25.6 (78.1)	28.8 (83.8)	29.7 (85.5)	27.4 (81.3)	25.3 (77.5)	24.5 (76.1)	25.1 (77.2)	25.0 (77.0)	22.3 (72.1)	20.2 (68.4)	24.7 (76.5)
Mean daily minimum °C (°F)	11.0 (51.8)	12.1 (53.8)	15.8 (60.4)	19.9 (67.8)	22.4 (72.3)	22.9 (73.2)	22.2 (72.0)	21.6 (70.9)	20.8 (69.4)	18.5 (65.3)	14.4 (57.9)	11.5 (52.7)	17.8 (64.0)
Record low °C (°F)	4.8 (40.6)	5.2 (41.4)	8.4 (47.1)	12.3 (54.1)	14.7 (58.5)	16.8 (62.2)	19.5 (67.1)	17.8 (64.0)	16.0 (60.8)	10.0 (50.0)	6.0 (42.8)	4.5 (40.1)	4.5 (40.1)
Average precipitation mm (inches)	0 (0)	3 (0.1)	2 (0.1)	11 (0.4)	40 (1.6)	138 (5.4)	163 (6.4)	129 (5.1)	155 (6.1)	68 (2.7)	28 (1.1)	4 (0.2)	741 (29.2)
Average precipitation days	0.1	0.3	0.3	1.1	3.3	10.9	17.0	16.2	10.9	5.0	2.4	0.3	67.8
Average relative humidity (%)	56	46	36	36	48	70	79	82	78	64	58	58	59
Mean monthly sunshine hours	291.4	282.8	300.7	303.0	316.2	186.0	120.9	111.6	177.0	248.0	270.0	288.3	2,895.9
Source: NOAA (1971–1990)

== Tourist attractions ==
=== Lakes ===
Vadivale Lake is one of the larger lakes in the area, at an altitude of 2200 ft above sea level. It is an artificially created lake due to the backwaters of the Uksan Dam. Thokarwadi lake is the biggest lake in the region second only to Pawna.

=== Other attractions ===
- Karla Caves: Karla Caves are 3rd century caves, well known for their rock-cut architecture. The caves were built by Theravada Buddhist monks. They are situated between Kamshet and Lonavla off the national highway NH4.
- Bedsa Caves: Bedsa Caves are Hinayana Buddhist Caves, said to be built in 1st century. The caves are famous for their animals and dancing figure sculptures.
- Bhaja Caves: Bhaja Caves are a group of 18 rock-cut caves built around 200 B.C. The major attraction is the group of 14 stupas, five inside and nine outside the caves.
- Wadeshwar Temple:Wadeshwar temple is near the Nane Road bridge. This temple is dedicated to Hindu god Shiva.
- Kondeshwar Temple: Koneshwar temple is an ancient elephant temple is located at Pohara. It is also well known as Shri Kondeshwar temple. It is dedicated to Hindu god Shiva.
- Sangameshwar Temple: Sangameshwar is a very old Shiva temple, near the junction of Kundalika River and Indrayani River.
