= Khalapur =

- Town
- Interactive map of Khalapur
- Country: India
- State: Maharashtra
- District: Raigad

Language
  - Official: Marathi

Khalapur is a town and tehsil in Raigad district, Maharashtra state of India. Some scenes of the Hollywood movie Close Encounters of the Third Kind was shot here.
