= Pavana Lake =

Lake in India

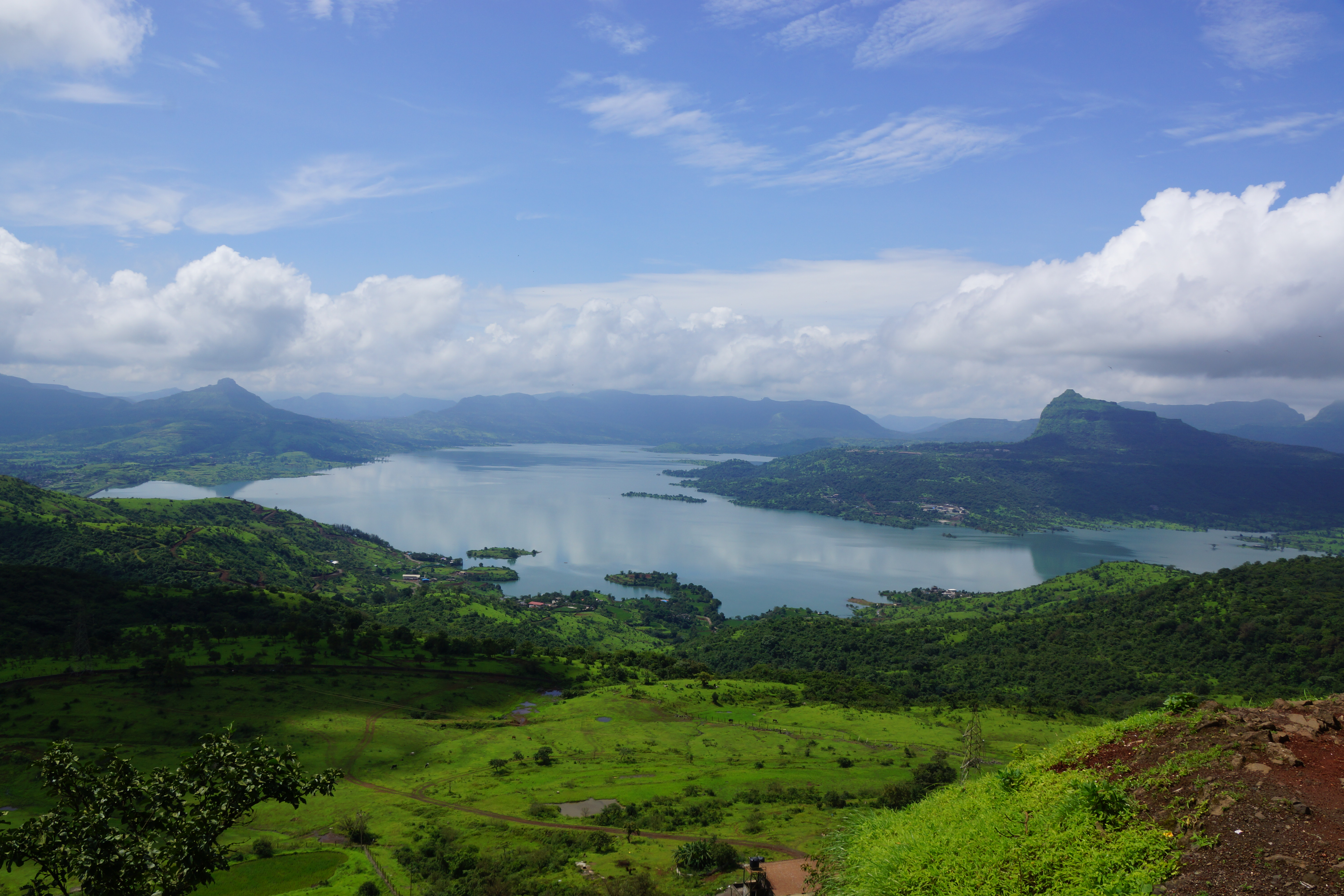

- Location within India
- Location: Maval taluka, Pune district, Maharashtra, India
- Coordinates: 18°40′30″N 73°29′10″E
- Type: Artificial Lake
- Etymology: Pavana River/Pavana Dam
- Built: 1973
- First flooded: 1973
- Settlements: Pune, Mumbai

Pavana Lake, also known as Pavana Dam Reservoir and Pawna Lake, is a reservoir turned artificial lake in the Indian state of Maharashtra, formed by the Pavana Dam across the Pavana River in Pune district. The reservoir is 25 km from Lonavala and is increasingly getting popular as picnic and camping site for visitors from Pune and Mumbai.

== History ==
The reservoir was formed as a consequence of the Pavana Dam project in Maval taluka in 1973. The backwaters of the Pavana Dam formed a reservoir, and the Pavana Dam backwaters subsequently came to be known as Pavana Lake.

== Tourism ==
In recent years, areas surrounding Pavana Dam and Pavana Dam Reservoir have seen a rapid rise in tourism due to the waterbody's proximity to Lonavala hill station and forts such as Lohagad, Tikona, and Tung. Various camping-site businesses have been started around Pavana Lake. Agro-tourism has also flourished. Pavana Lake attracts visitors mainly from the two major neighboring cities of Pune and Mumbai. Around 4,000 people from these two cities visit the lake every weekend.

== Ecological concerns and illegal activities ==
Due to the increasing commercialization of the nature and forest cover surrounding Pavana Dam and the banks of Pavana Lake, the backwaters and the ecosystem around the waterbody and dam are being negatively affected. In January 2018, after the death of a techie due to drowning, the Water Resources Department of the state government sent notices of eviction to 250 camping sites, alleging activities such as illegal consumption of liquor and drugs, boating in the dam reservoir, and causing damage to the local ecosystem.

The catchment areas around the lake and the hills along the waterbody are being used by Bollywood actors, traders, industrialists, and sportspersons to build farmhouses and mansions, most of them illegal, destroying the biodiversity of Pavana Lake and surrounding areas and destabilising the terrain. In July 2018, a petition was filed with the National Green Tribunal's (NGT) Pune bench against such construction around the lake.

In December 2018, a fisherman caught a giant alligator gar, a fish native to North America, in the Pavana Dam backwaters, again raising questions about the safety and illegal activities around the lake and its surrounding areas.
