= Permit room =

Alcohol service area of a restaurant in India

A permit room in India is a section of a restaurant where it is permitted to serve alcoholic drinks.
