= Udhewadi =

Village in Maharashtra

- Village
- Country: India
- State: Maharashtra
- District: Pune
- Tehsil: Mawal

Government
  - Type: Panchayati Raj
  - Body: Gram panchayat

Area
  - Total: 2,316 ha (5,720 acres)

Population (2011)
  - Total: 287
  - Density: 12.4/km^{2} (32.1/sq mi)
- Sex ratio 158 / 129 ♂/♀

Languages
  - Official: Marathi
  - Other spoken: Hindi
- Time zone: UTC+5:30 (IST)
- Telephone code: 02114
- ISO 3166 code: IN-MH
- Vehicle registration: MH-14
- Website: pune.nic.in

Udhewadi is a small village and a gram panchayat situated in the Mawal taluka of Pune district in the state of Maharashtra, India. The village lies at the base of the Rajmachi Fort a historic hill-fort in the Sahyadri range, and serves as the de facto base village for trekkers and visitors to the fort complex.

== Administration ==
The village is administrated by a sarpanch, an elected representative who leads a gram panchayat. At the time of the 2011 Census of India, the village was a self-contained gram panchayat, meaning that there were no other constituent villages governed by the body.

== Geography and Location ==
Udhewadi is located in the Sahyadri (Western Ghats) mountain range, within Mawal taluka, Pune district. The region is characterized by hilly terrain, forest cover, and proximity to the twin-fort hill complex of Rajmachi (comprising Shrivardhan and Manaranjan forts). Due to its location, Udhewadi sits on the plateau/machi that lies below the Manaranjan fort's southern foot.

The village covers an area of approximately 2,316 hectares.

== Demographics ==
As per the 2011 Census of India, Udhewadi had a total of 60 households, with a population of 287 individuals: 158 males and 129 females.

- Children (age 0–6): 38 (which constitutes 13.24% of total population) Census 2011 India
- Sex Ratio: 816 females per 1000 males (lower than Maharashtra state average of 929) Census 2011 India
- Child Sex Ratio (0–6 years): 727 (lower than state average of 894) Census 2011 India
- Literacy rate: 53.01% (Male: 62.50%, Female: 41.59%) — notably lower than the state average of 82.34%.

Community composition: The village population largely belongs to Scheduled Tribes (ST), which form around 78.75% of the total population. There was no Scheduled Caste (SC) population recorded in 2011.

Work profile: Out of 287 people, 138 were engaged in work activities. Among them, 65.22% were engaged in "main work" (employment or earning more than 6 months), while 34.78% were involved in marginal activities (less than 6 months). Of main workers, 25 were cultivators (owners/co-owners), and 1 was an agricultural labourer.

== Historical and cultural significance ==
Although the village of Udhewadi itself does not have a widely documented independent history, it is intimately tied to the history of Rajmachi Fort. comprising twin forts Shrivardhan and Manaranjan has a long heritage dating back to ancient times and gained prominence under the rule of Chhatrapati Shivaji Maharaj in the 17th century.

== Economy and livelihood ==
Based on 2011 census data: agriculture (cultivation) is one of the primary livelihoods among main workers (25 out of 138). Given the rugged terrain and forested surroundings, agriculture may be limited and supplemented with forest-related livelihoods, labour, or services associated with trekking and tourism.

In recent decades, with increasing popularity of trekking and eco-tourism to Rajmachi Fort, some local inhabitants may have diversified into tourism-related services, homestays, guiding, camping support, though published data is currently sparse. This represents a potential area for primary research or local surveys.

== Tourism and Role in Trekking ==
Udhewadi is the main staging point for treks to Rajmachi Fort. Trek routes from Lonavala or Karjat pass through this village, making it a critical access hub.

During monsoon, the surrounding hills, waterfalls, lush greenery, and misty Western Ghats add to the appeal, attracting trekkers and nature-lovers. Trek and camping operators often cite Udhewadi as base village for night stays.

This connection with tourism potentially increases local economic opportunities, but also underscores the need for sustainable management of environmental impact and preservation of local community interests.

== See also ==
- List of villages in Mawal taluka
- Rajmachi Fort
- Manaranjan Fort
- Shrivardhan Fort
