= Kondana Caves =

Cave group in Maharashtra, India

Kondhana Caves Kondhane Caves
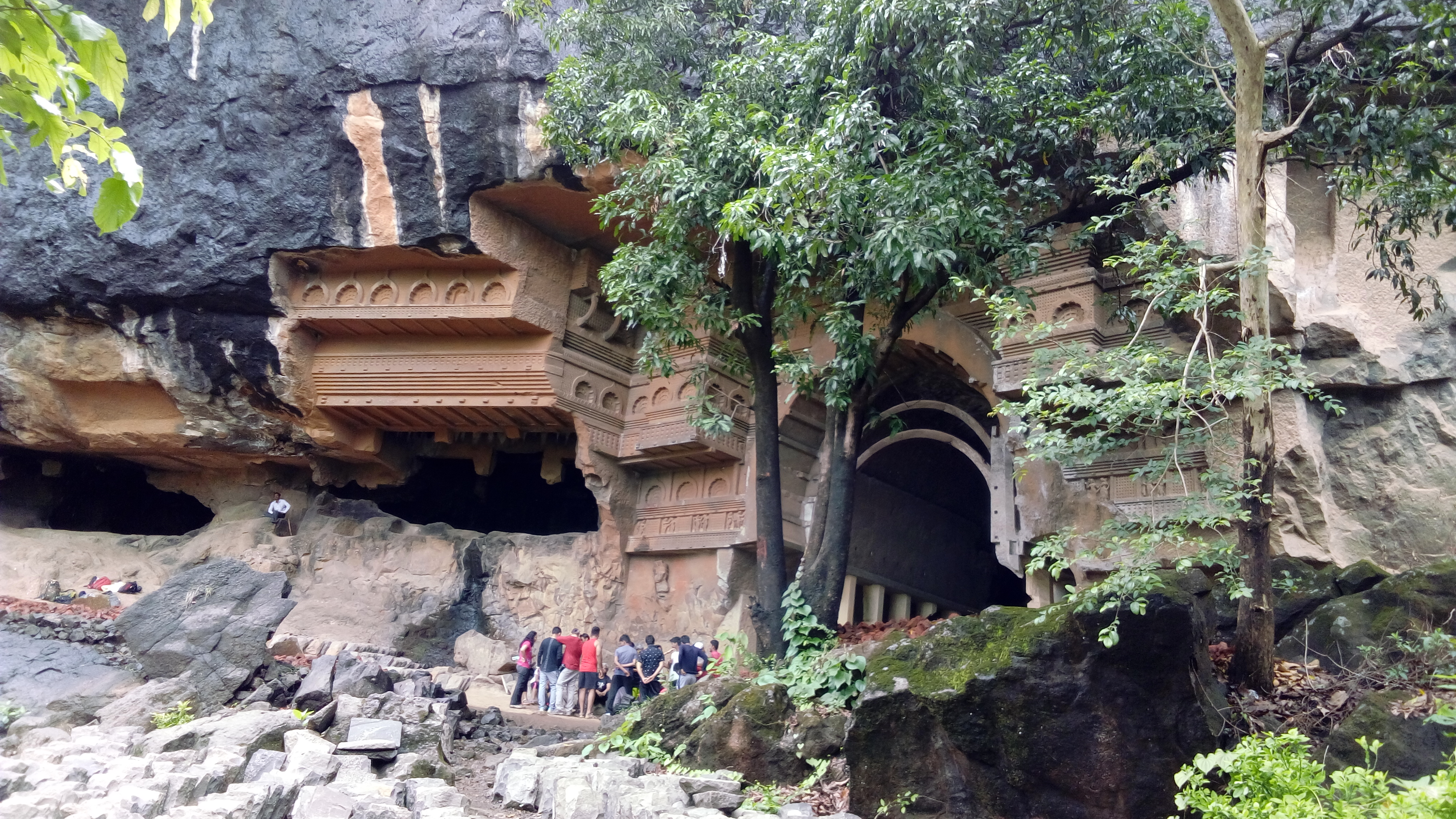
- Kondana Caves, Maharashtra

- Location within India Location within Maharashtra
- Location: Maharashtra,
- Coordinates: 18.839291°N 73.384370°E
- Geology: Basalt

The Kondhana Caves are located in the small village of Kondhane, 33 km (21 mi) north of Lonavala and 16 km (9.9 mi) northwest of Karla Caves. This cave group has 16 Buddhist caves. The caves were excavated in the first century B.C. The construction on wooden pattern is notable. One can reach the cave by descending from Rajmachi village.

The cave has only one inscription on the front of the Chaitya, which gives information about donors.

== Description ==
About 14 km (8.7 mi) from the Karjat station, on Central Railway, and at the base of the old hill fort of Rajmachi, is the Kondane group of caves, first brought to notice in the 19th century by Vishnu Sastri, and soon after visited by Mr. Law, then collector of Thana. They are in the face of a steep scarp, and quite hidden from view by the thick forest in front of them. Water trickles down over the face of the rock above them during a considerable part even of the dry season, and has greatly injured them. So much so indeed that it is now difficult to determine whether they or the caves at Bhaja Caves are the earliest. They must be nearly, if not quite contemporary, and as they must have taken some time to excavate, their dates may overlap to some extent. The Vihara at Kondane certainly looks more modern, while the Chaitya, which is very similar in plan and dimensions to that at Bhaja, is so much ruined that it is impossible now to decide which may have been first completed.

=== Cave No1: Chaitya ===
They face north-west, and the first to the south-west is a Chaitya-cave of very considerable dimensions, being 66.5 feet from the line of the front pillars to the extremity of the apse, 26 feet 8 inches wide, and 28 feet 5 inches high to the crown of the arch. The nave in front of the dagoba is 49 feet in length by 14 feet 8 inches, and the dagoba 9.5 feet in diameter, with a capital of more than usual height, the neck representing the relic casket being, as at Bhaja, of double the ordinary height, and representing two coffers, one above the other, carved on the sides with the Buddhist rail pattern. The fillets that covered this are decayed, as is also the whole of the lower part of the dagoba.

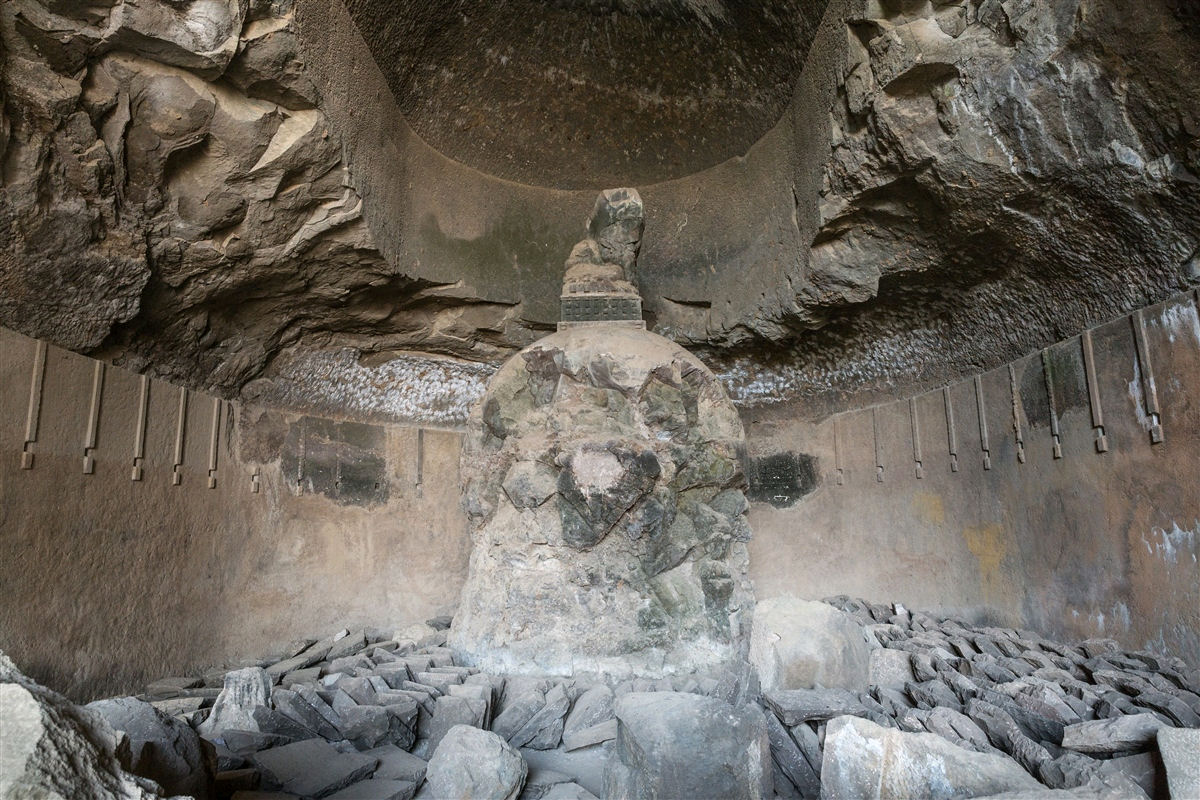
Chaitya dagoba.

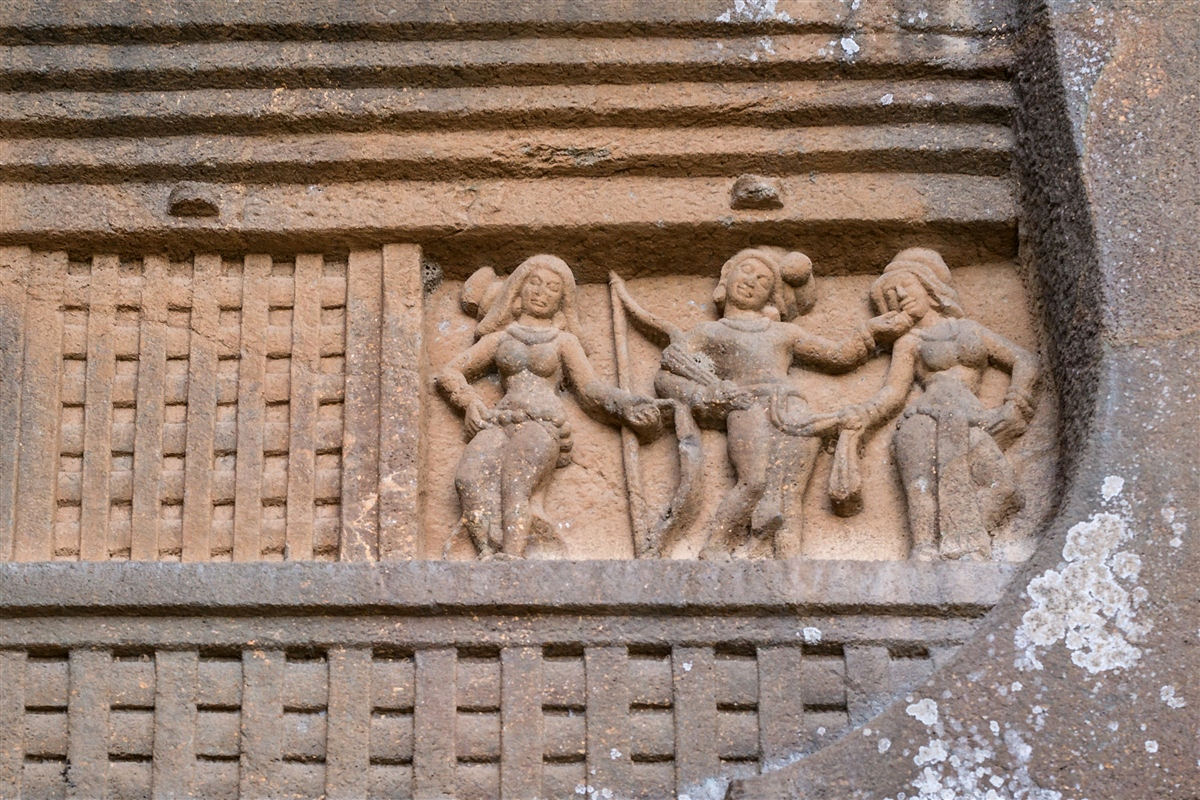
Chaitya façade detail.

The bases with the lower parts of all the thirty columns that surrounded the nave, as well as that of one of the two irregular columns that once ornamented the front, have also decayed, and positions only of most of them can now be ascertained. Between these two latter pillars a wooden screen or front originally filled the opening to a height of about 10 or 12 feet, in which were the doorways leading to the interior and it was fixed to them, as seems to have been the case with all the earlier caves. The Chaitya Cave at Bhaja and that at Kondane had similar fronts constructed in wood. The caves at Bedsa and Karla are apparently among the earliest, where these screens were carved in the rock instead of being erected in the more perishable material.

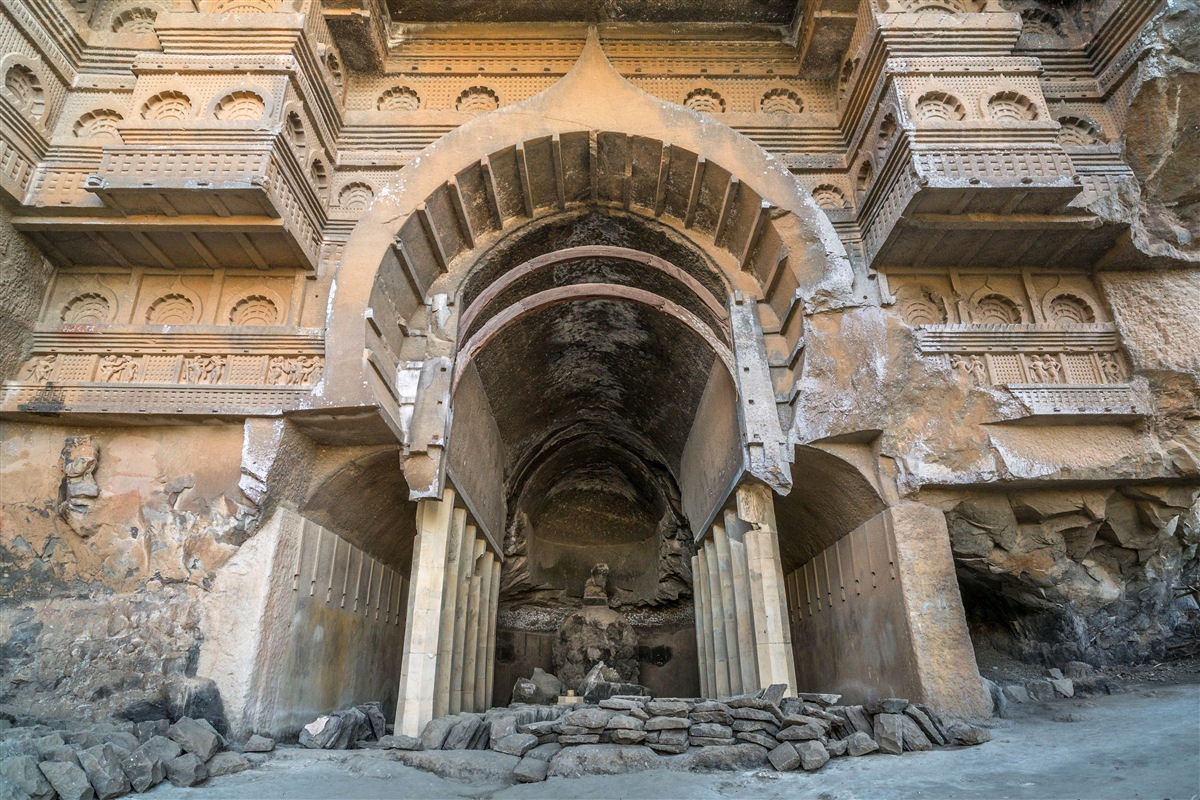
The Chaitya.

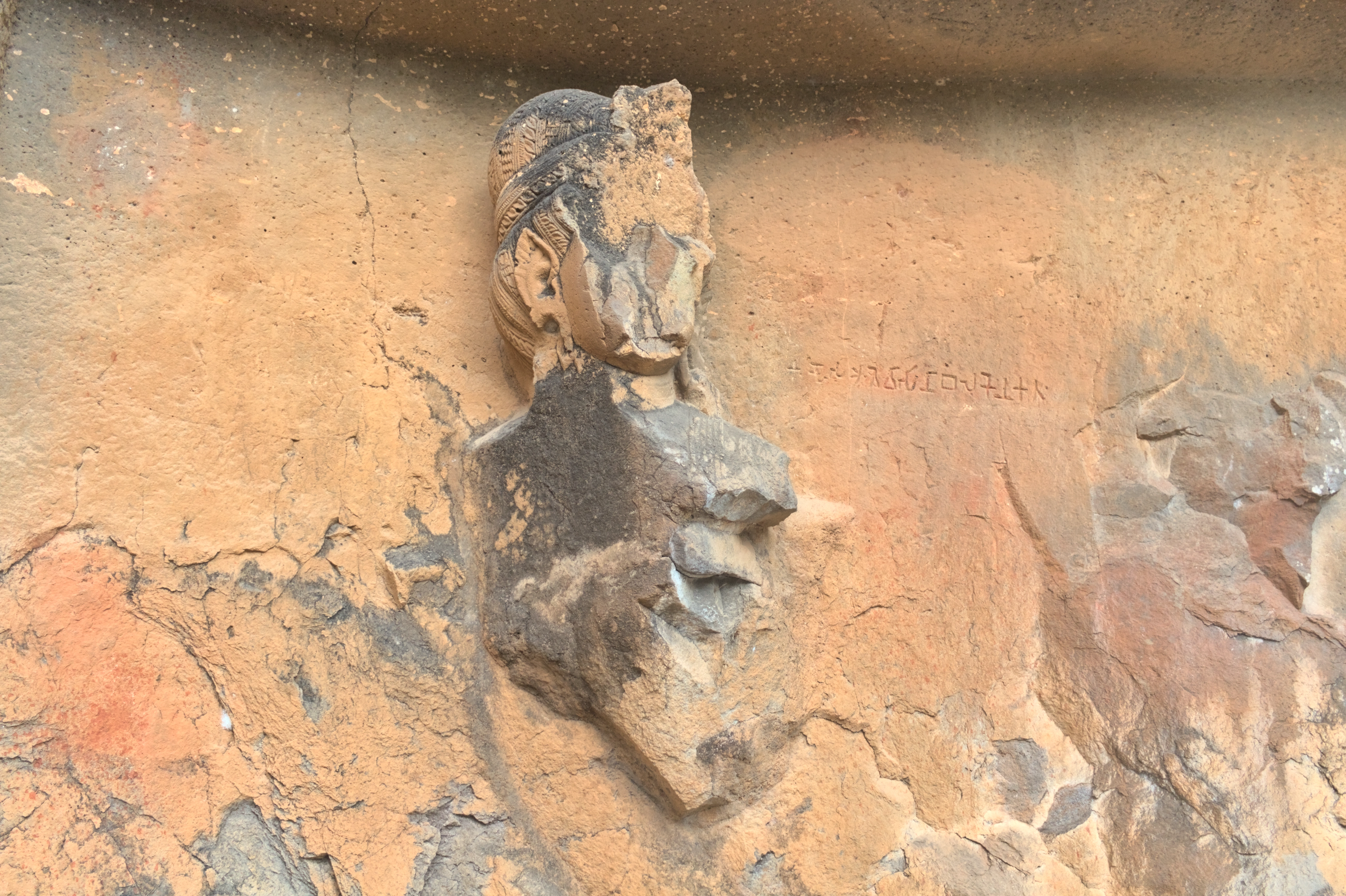
Remain of the sculpture of a head, with inscription.

There are still, however, remains of seven pillars on the left side of the cave, and six on the south, which rake inwards, as do also those at Bhaja and Bedsa, a proof of the early date of the work; those behind the dagoba and six near the front on the right side have disappeared entirely. On the upper portion of one column on the left is a symbol or device somewhat resembling a dagoba, with a rude canopy over it. The arched roof has had wooden rafters as at Karle and elsewhere, but they are gone, and the only remains of the woodwork is a portion of the latticed screen in the front arch. The façade bears a strong family likeness to that at Bhaja. On the left side is a fragment of sculpture in high-relief part of the head of a single figure about twice life-size. The features are destroyed, but the details of the headdress show the most careful attention to finish of detail. Over the left shoulder is an inscription in one line in Brahmi characters which reads: Kanvasa antevasina Balakena katam ("Made by Balakena, the pupil of Kanha (Krishna)").

Over this head, at the level of the spring of the great arch in the facade, is a broad projecting belt of sculpture: the lower portion of it is carved with the rail pattern; the central portion is divided into seven compartments, filled alternately, three with a lattice pattern and five with human figures, one male in the first, a male and female in each of the third and fifth, and a male with a bow and two females in the seventh. Over these is a band with the representations of the ends of tie-beams or bars projecting through it, and then four fillets, each projecting over the one below, and the upper half of the last serrated. The corresponding belt of carving on the right side of the facade is much damaged by the falling away of the rock at the end next the arch.

=== Cave No.2: Vihara ===
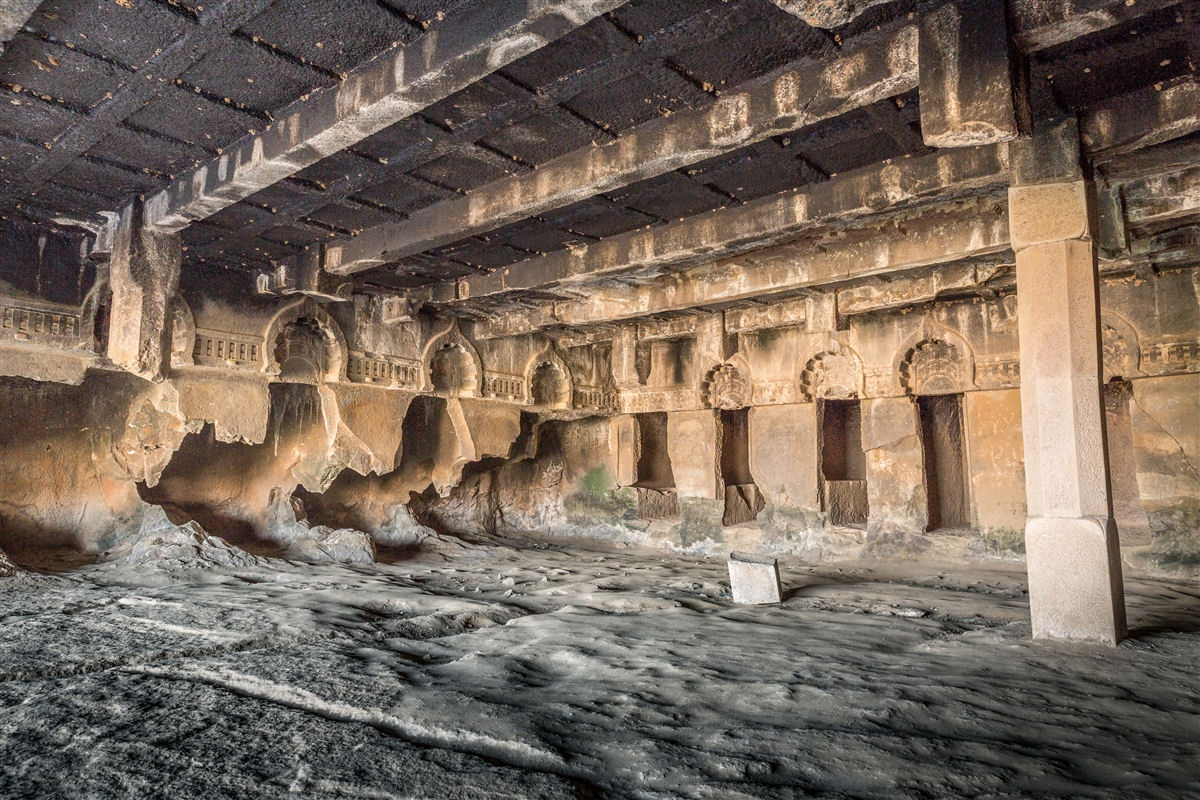
Interior of a vihara.

A little to north-east is No. II., a Vihara, of which the front of the veranda is totally destroyed except the left end. This verandah was 5 feet 8 inches wide and 18 feet long, with the unique number of five octagon pillars and two antae. In the end of this veranda is a raised recess, and under a Chaitya arch is a small dagoba in half relief, apparently the only object of worship when these caves were excavated. Inside, the hall is 23 feet wide by 29 deep, and 8 feet 3 inches high, with 15 pillars arranged about 3 feet apart and from the side and back walls, but none across the front. The upper portions of these pillars are square, but about 1.5 feet from the top they are octagonal: the bases of all are gone, but they also were probably square.

The roof is panelled in imitation of a structural hall with beams 19 inches deep by 8 thick, 3.5 feet apart, running across through the heads of the pillars, and the spaces between divided by smaller false rafters, 5 inches broad by 2 deep. There are three wide doors into the hall, though most of the front wall is broken away, and on each side six cells in all, each with the monk's bed in it, and the first on each side with two. Over the doors of 14 of these cells are carved Chaitya or horse-shoe arches, connected by a string course projecting 6 or 7 inches and carved with the rail pattern.

=== Cave No.3 ===
Cave No.3 is a plain Vihara with nine cells, much ruined, especially in front, but it had probably three doors.

=== Cave No.4 ===
No.4 has row of nine cells at the back of what now looks like a natural hollow under the cliff. Beyond them is a tank, now filled with mud, then two cells under a deep ledge of over-hanging rock, and, lastly, a small cistern.

== Gallery ==
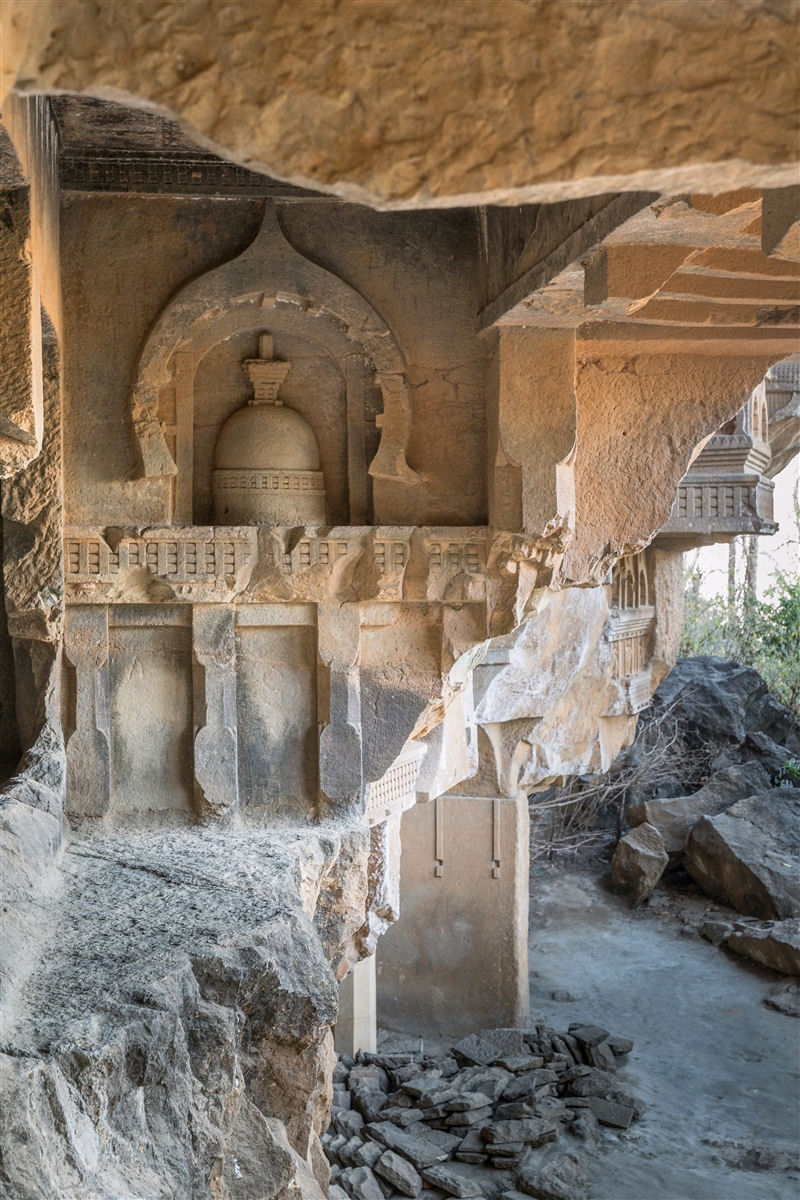

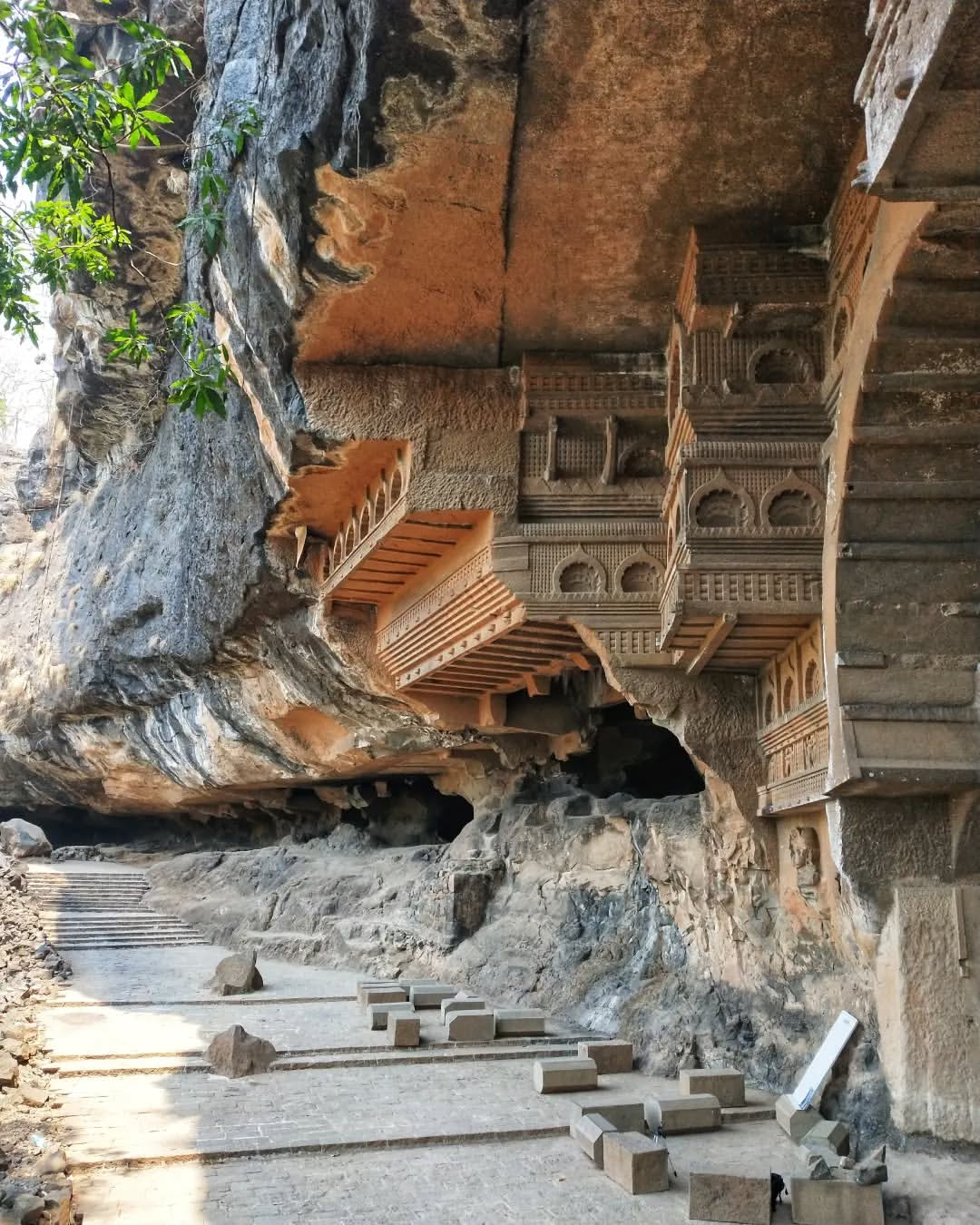

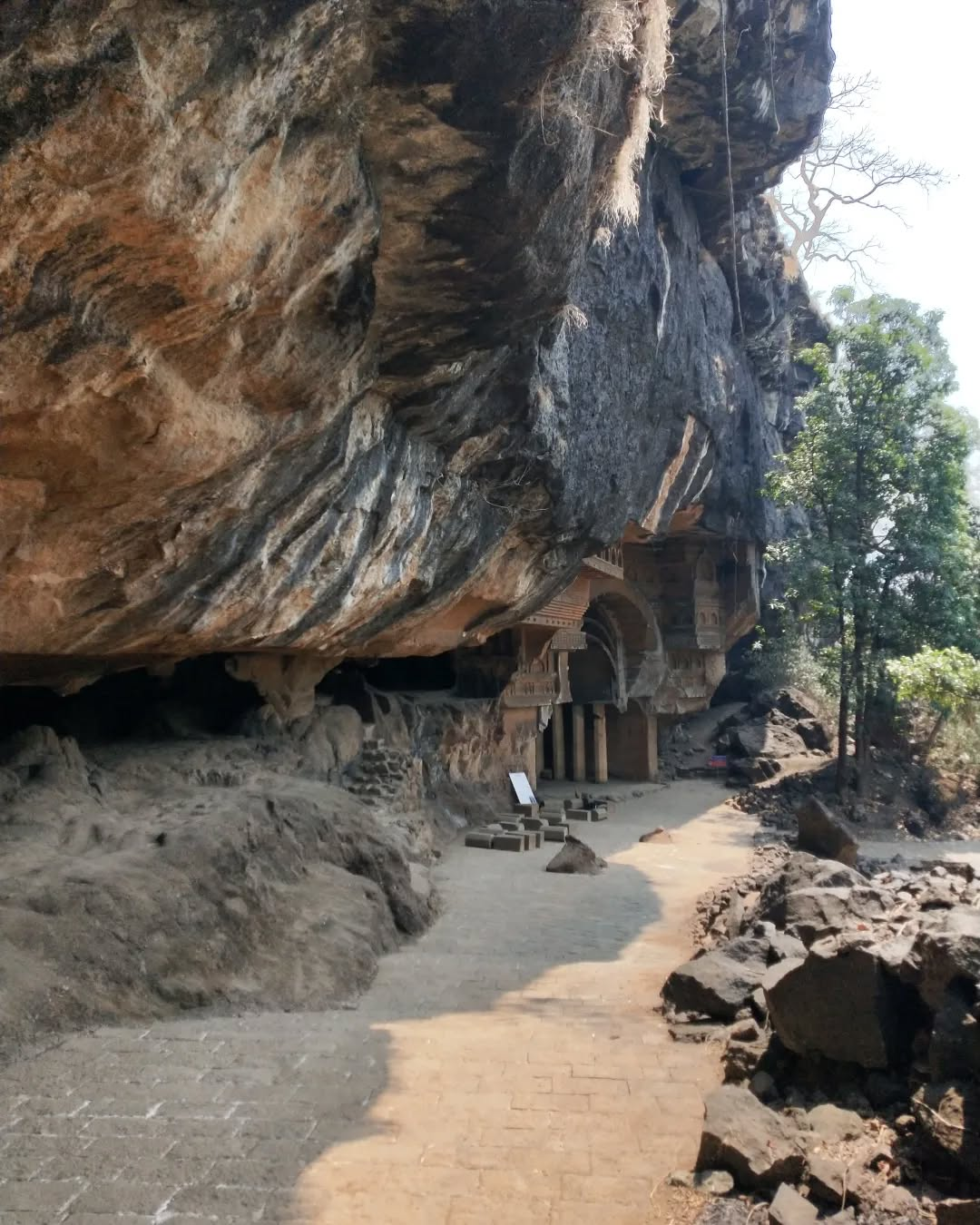

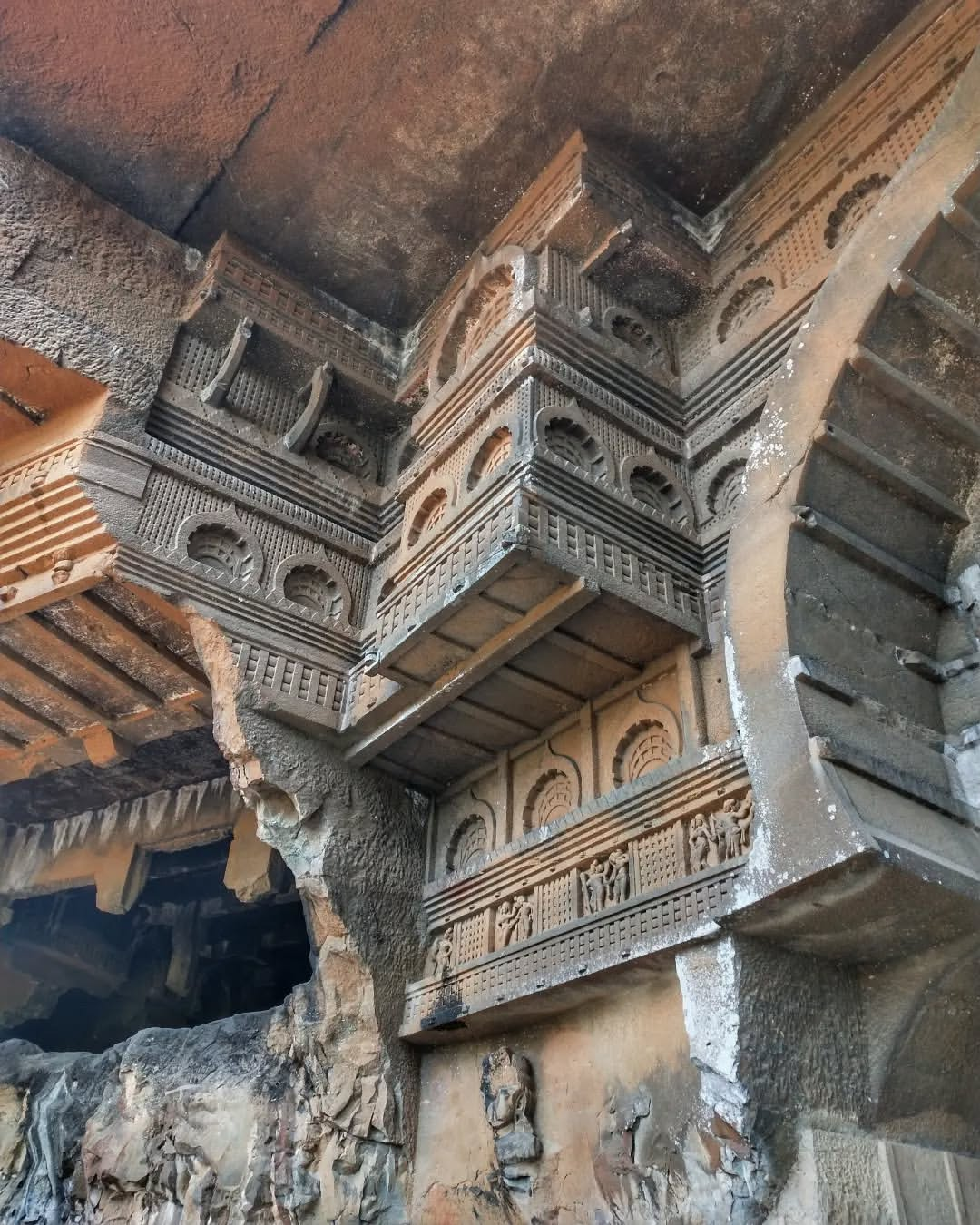

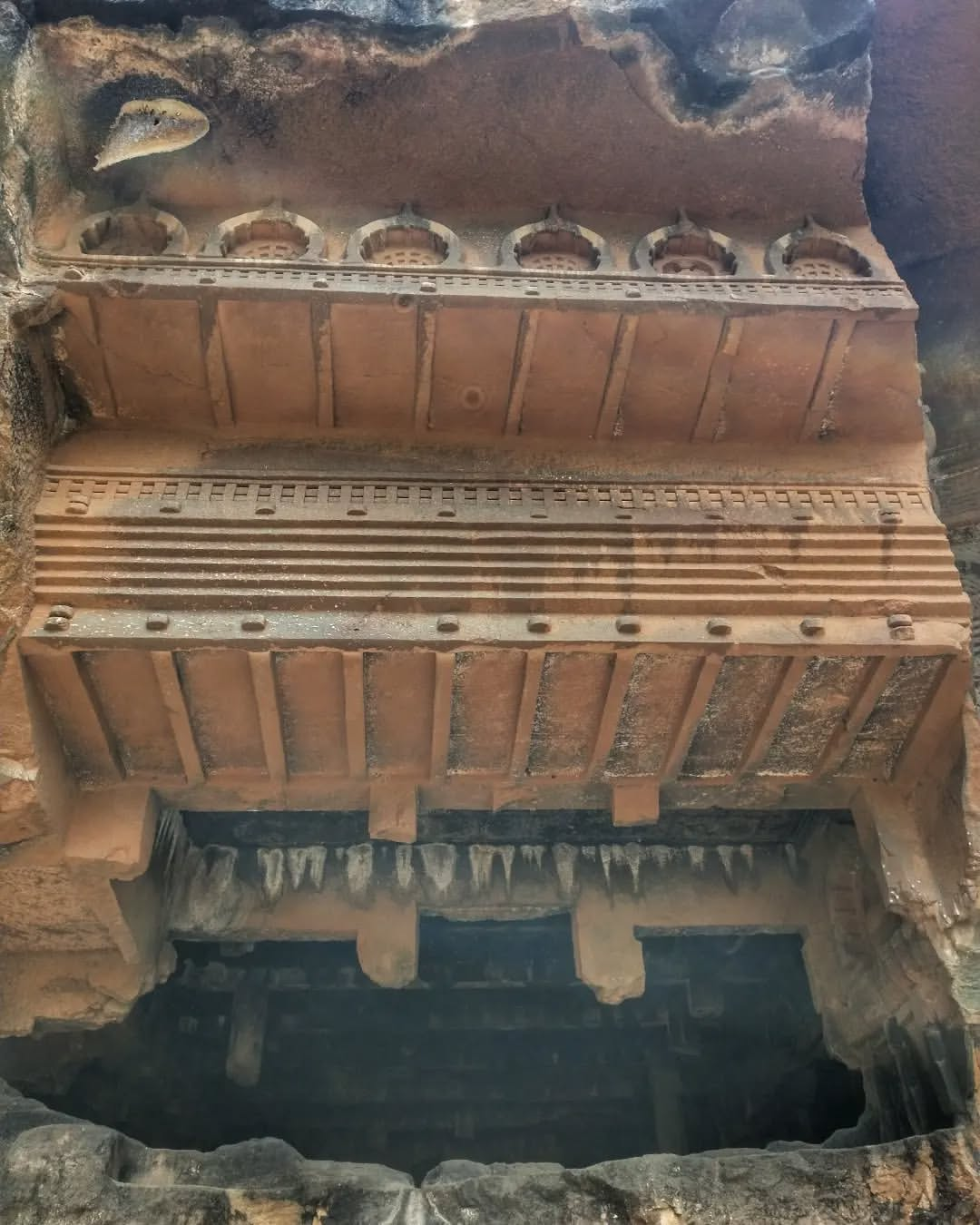

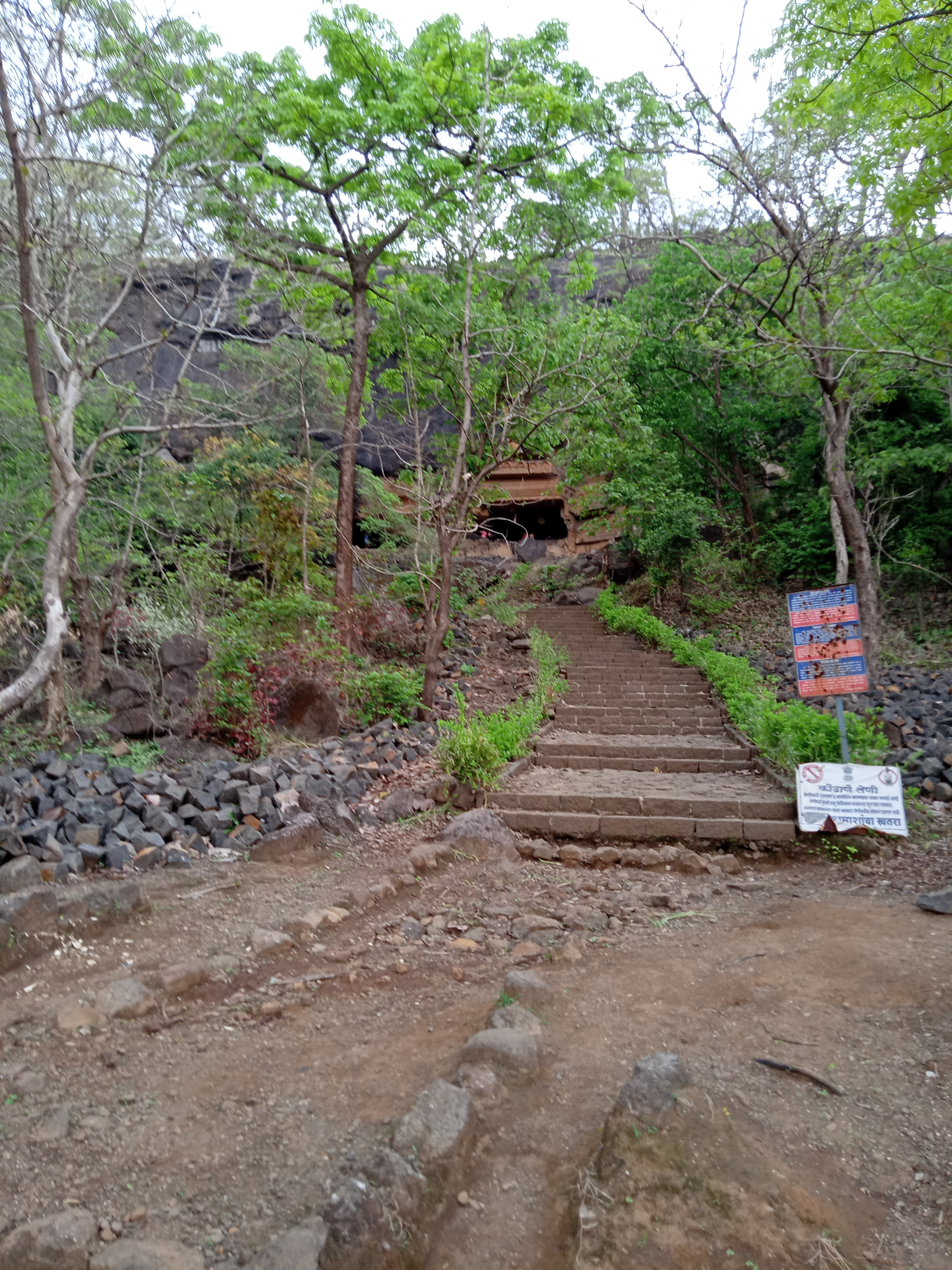
