= Shrivardhan Fort =

Hill Fort in Maharashtra, India

- Part of Sahyadri Hill Range
- Pune district, Maharashtra
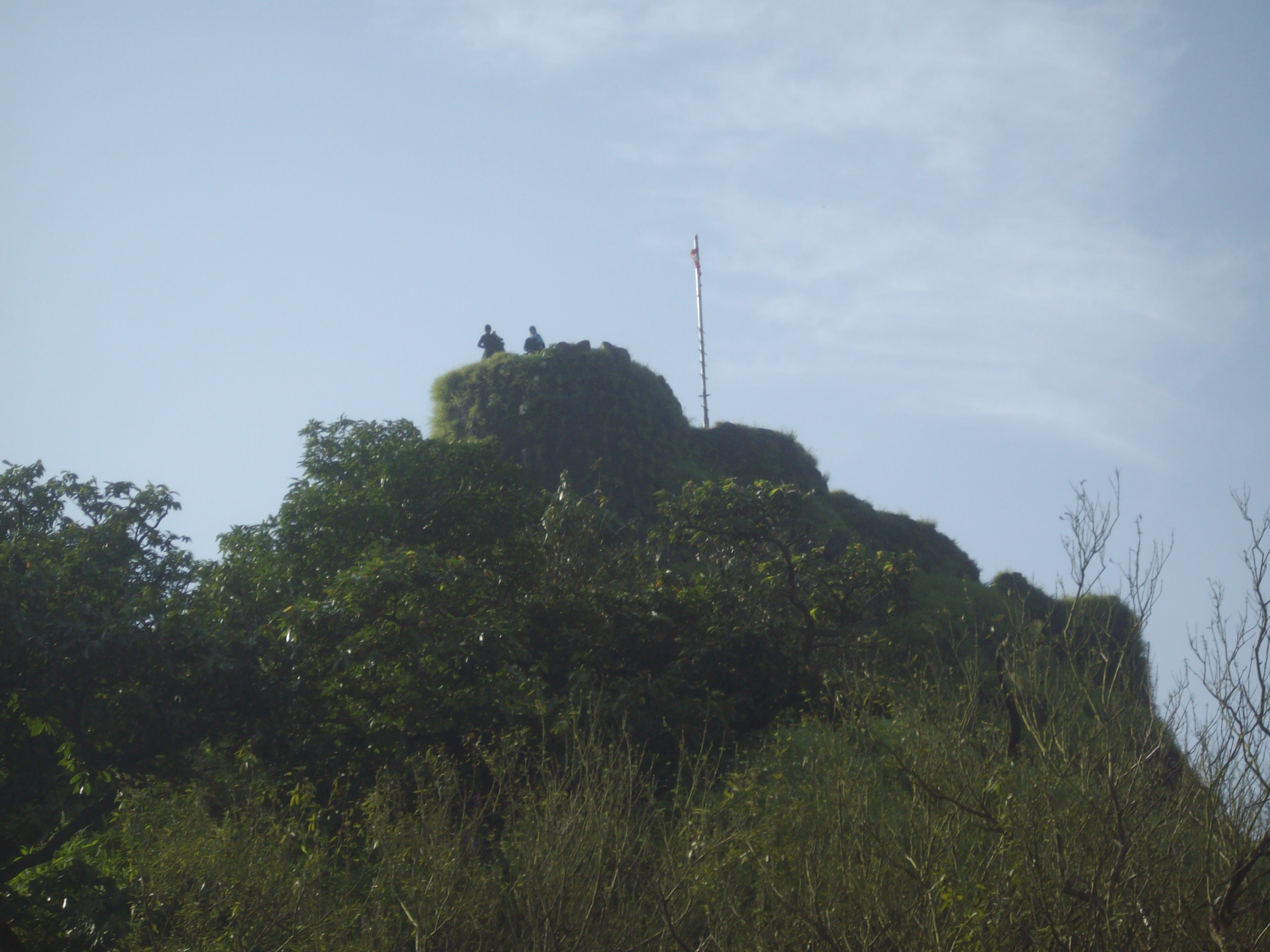
- Shrivardhan fort

Site information
- Type: Hill fort
- Owner: Government of India
- Controlled by: Maratha Empire (1739–1818); United Kingdom: East India Company (1818–1857); British Raj (1857–1947); India (1947-)
- Open to the public: Yes
- Condition: Ruins

Location
- Shown within Maharashtra Shrivardhan Fort (India)
- Coordinates: 18°49′37.8″N 73°24′00″E
- Height: 3600 Ft.

Site history
- Materials: Stone

Shrivardhan Fort is one of the two hill forts that constitute the Rajmachi fortification, the other being Manaranjan Fort. It is located in Rajmachi village which 8.5 km from Lonavala in the Sahyadris mountain range. At 900 m(3000 feet) above sea level it was the taller of the two peaks and was named after Shrivardhan Ganpatrao Patwardhan. Other than a rampart there is no visible construction. It was probably used at a watchtower for the Sahyadri region. There are two water tanks at the top of the hill but one of them has an iron pillar in it.

== How to reach ==
There are two ways to reach the fort 1) Lonavla Tungarli way. It is an easy path which takes about 1 hour to reach the base village Udhewadi 2) Karjat-kondivade way. It requires a trekking up the hill for 2-hour. This route passes through dense forest area through the Ulhas river valley.

== See also ==
- List of forts in Maharashtra
- List of forts in India
- Shivaji
- List of Maratha dynasties and states
- Maratha War of Independence
- Battles involving the Maratha Empire
- Maratha Army
- Maratha titles
- Military history of India
- Kondana Caves
