= Kataldhar Lonavla =

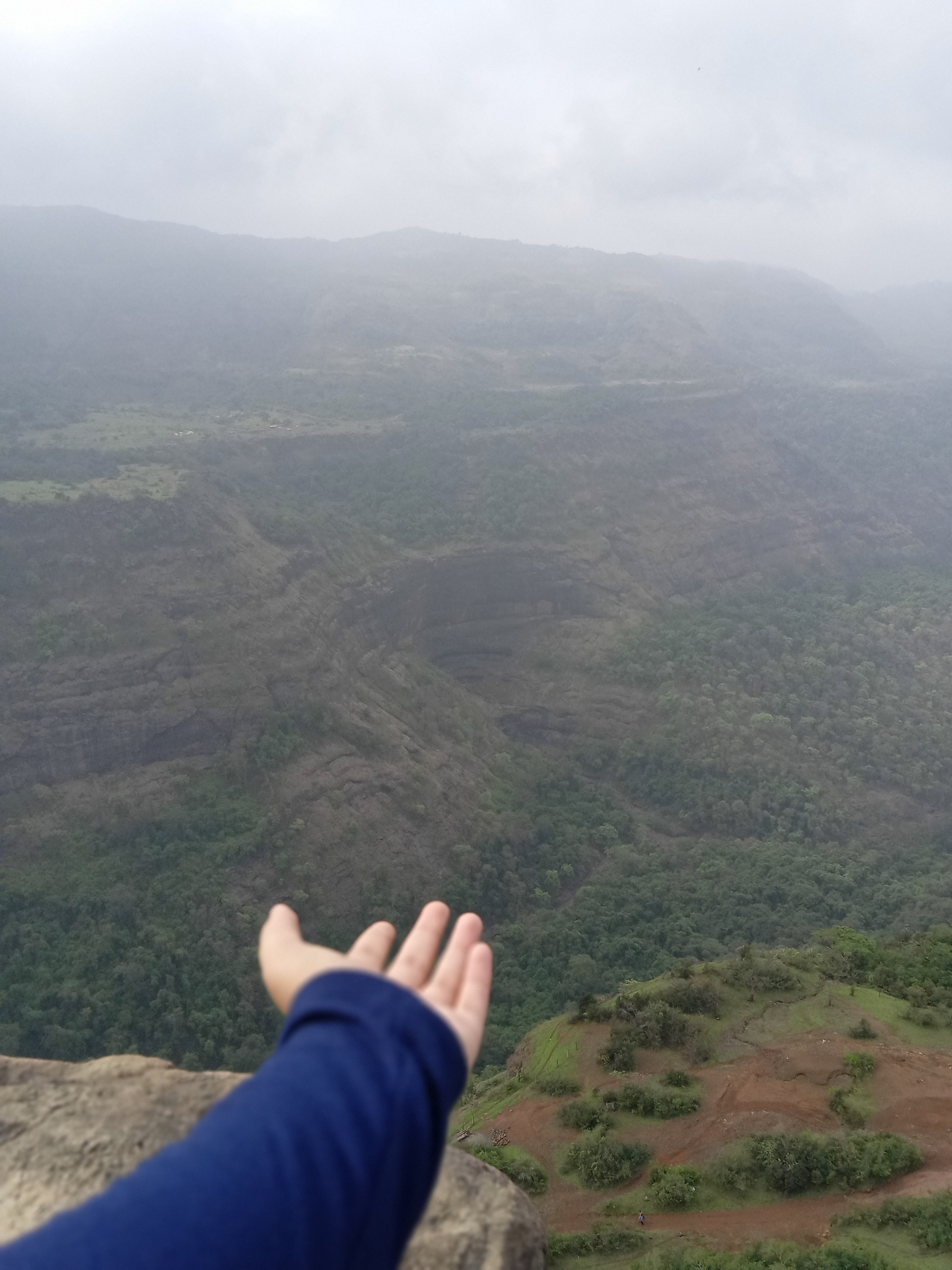
A view from Rajmachi of Kataldhar Waterfall before monsoon

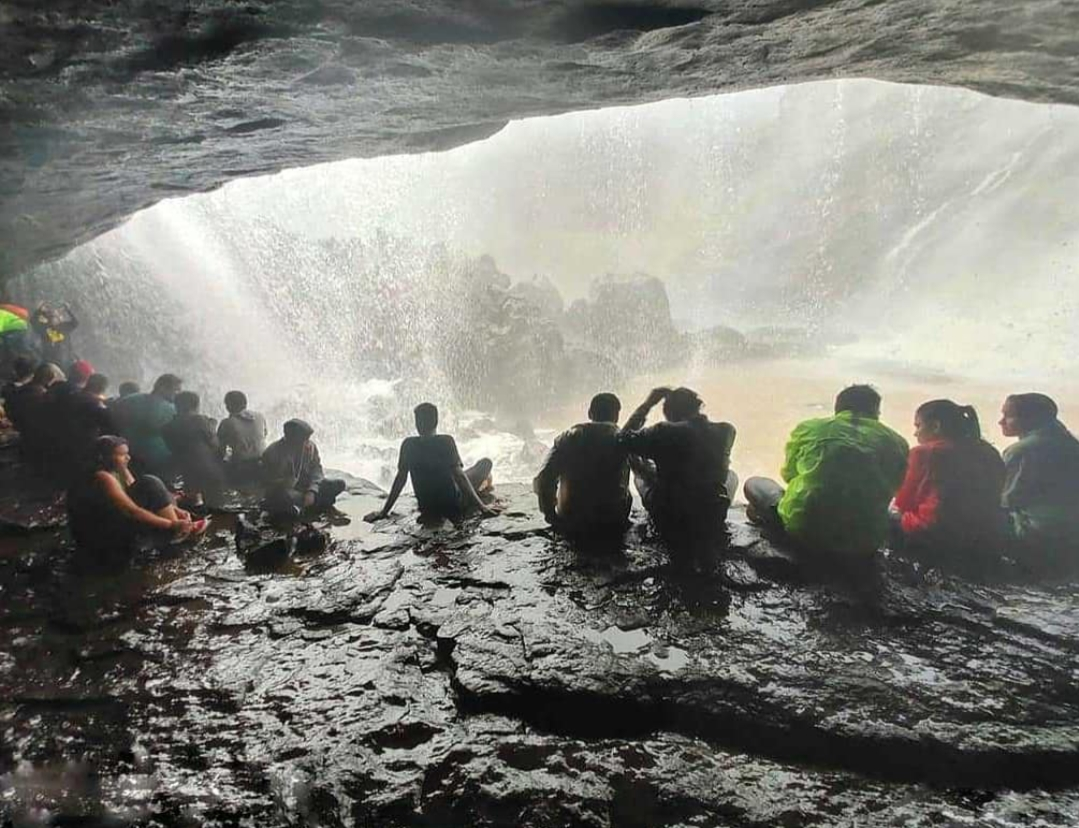
Eye Shaped Cave

Kataldhar is a waterfall near Lonavala in Pune district in the Indian state of Maharashtra. This waterfall is not so famous because reaching the valley is somewhat difficult and requires basic trekking experience. Water is not available there for the whole year, but a good amount of water falls during the monsoon season.

Kataldhar Waterfall is located near Rajmachi Fort. To get there, find 3 mango trees on the Rajmachi Trekking route, at which point you can descend the Ulhas valley through dense forest. After reaching Kataldhar Waterfall you will see one eye shaped cave that could easily accommodate 100 people. At this cave, you will see Rajmachi Fort (Srivardhan Fort Balekilla).

The height of Kataldhar Lonavla is about 350 feet with an overhand of more than 100 feet.

== See also ==
- List of waterfalls
- List of waterfalls in India
