= Manaranjan Fort =

Hill fort in India

Manaranjan fort is one of the two hill forts that constitute the Rajmachi fortification, the other being Shrivardhan Fort. It is located in Rajmachi village which 8.5 km from Lonavala in the Sahyadris mountain range. Manaranjan fort is 2700 feet high which makes it lower than the neighbouring Shreevardhan fort. It has three gates and large ramparts. From here Karnala fort can be seen. There are some water tanks at the summit.
