= Rajmachi =

Village in Maharashtra

Rajmachi Udhewadi
- village
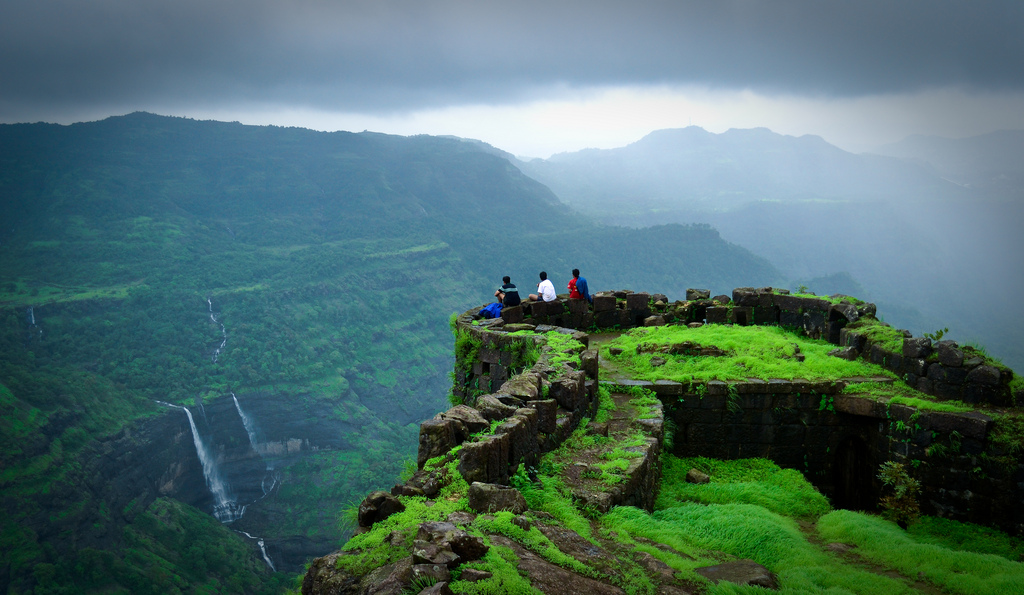
- Rajmachi Fort

- Location in Maharashtra, India Rajmachi (India)
- Coordinates: 18.825799°N 73.3955267°E
- Country: India
- State: Maharashtra
- District: Pune District
- Talukas: Maval

Languages
  - Official: Marathi
- Time zone: UTC+5:30 (IST)
- Nearest city: Lonavala
- Lok Sabha constituency: Lonavala

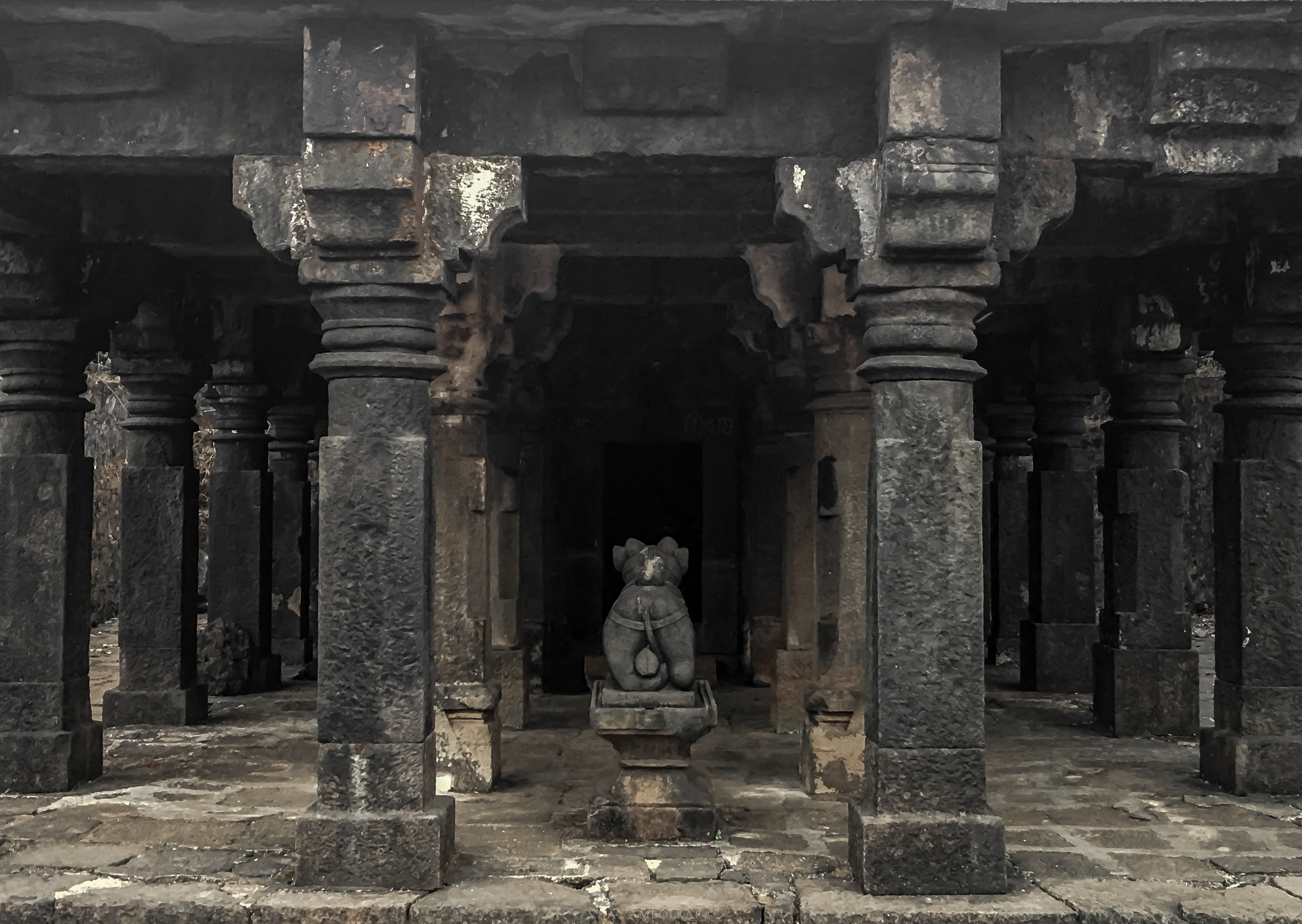

Rajmachi Fort (Killa) is a historical fort in the hills of the Sahyadri mountains (Western Ghats). It consists of two twin fortresses Shriwardhan and Manaranjan, with a wide machi (plateau) surrounding the two Balekillas. Udhewadi is a small village of about 60 households (as per 2011 census report) situated on the machi, at the southern foot of Manaranjan Balekilla of Rajmachi Fort.

== History ==
The fort played a strategic role in the First Anglo-Maratha War.

Rajmachi Fort has been declared as a protected monument.

== See also ==
- Shrivardhan Fort
- Kataldhar Lonavla Waterfall
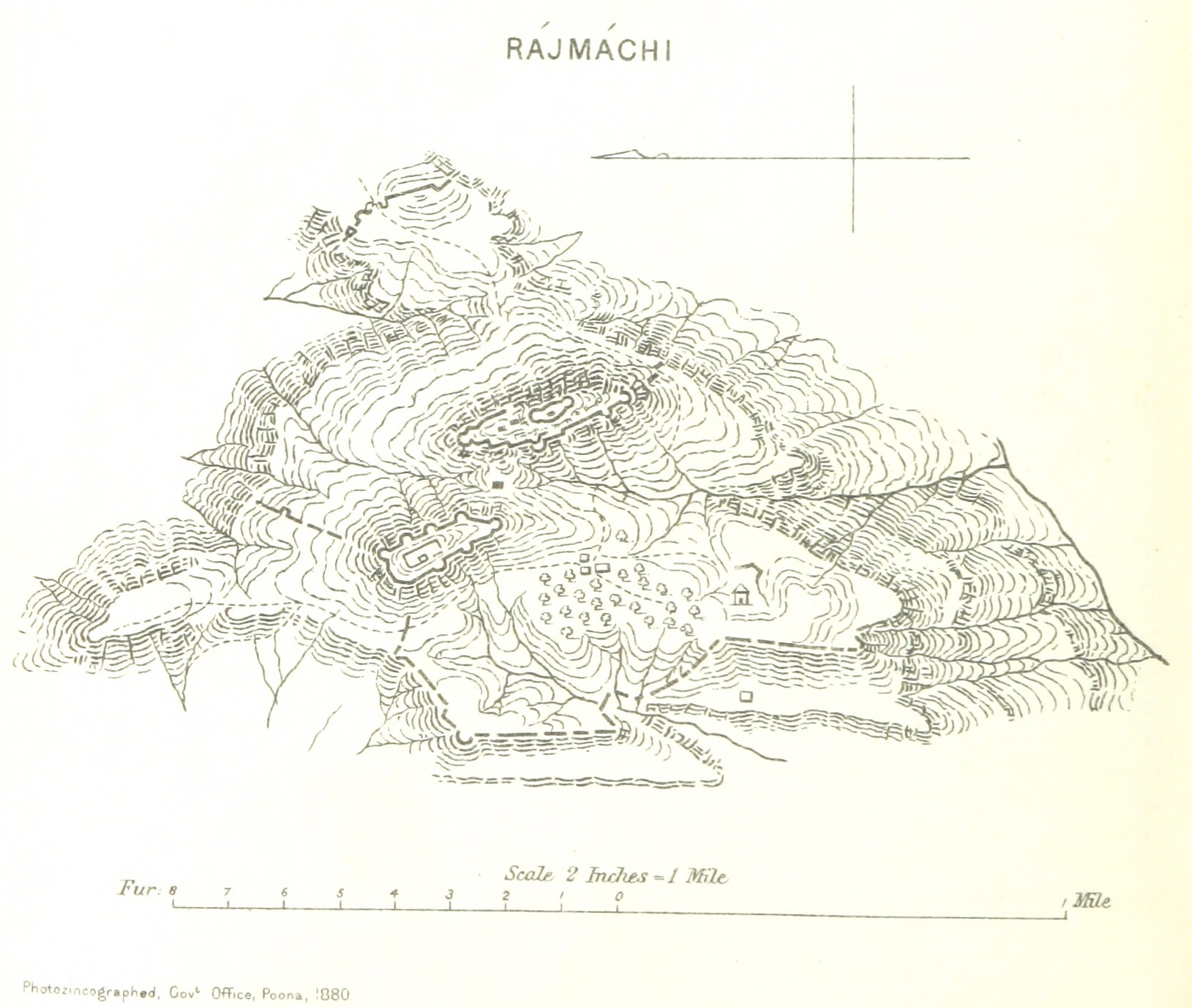
