= Lonavala =

- Hill station
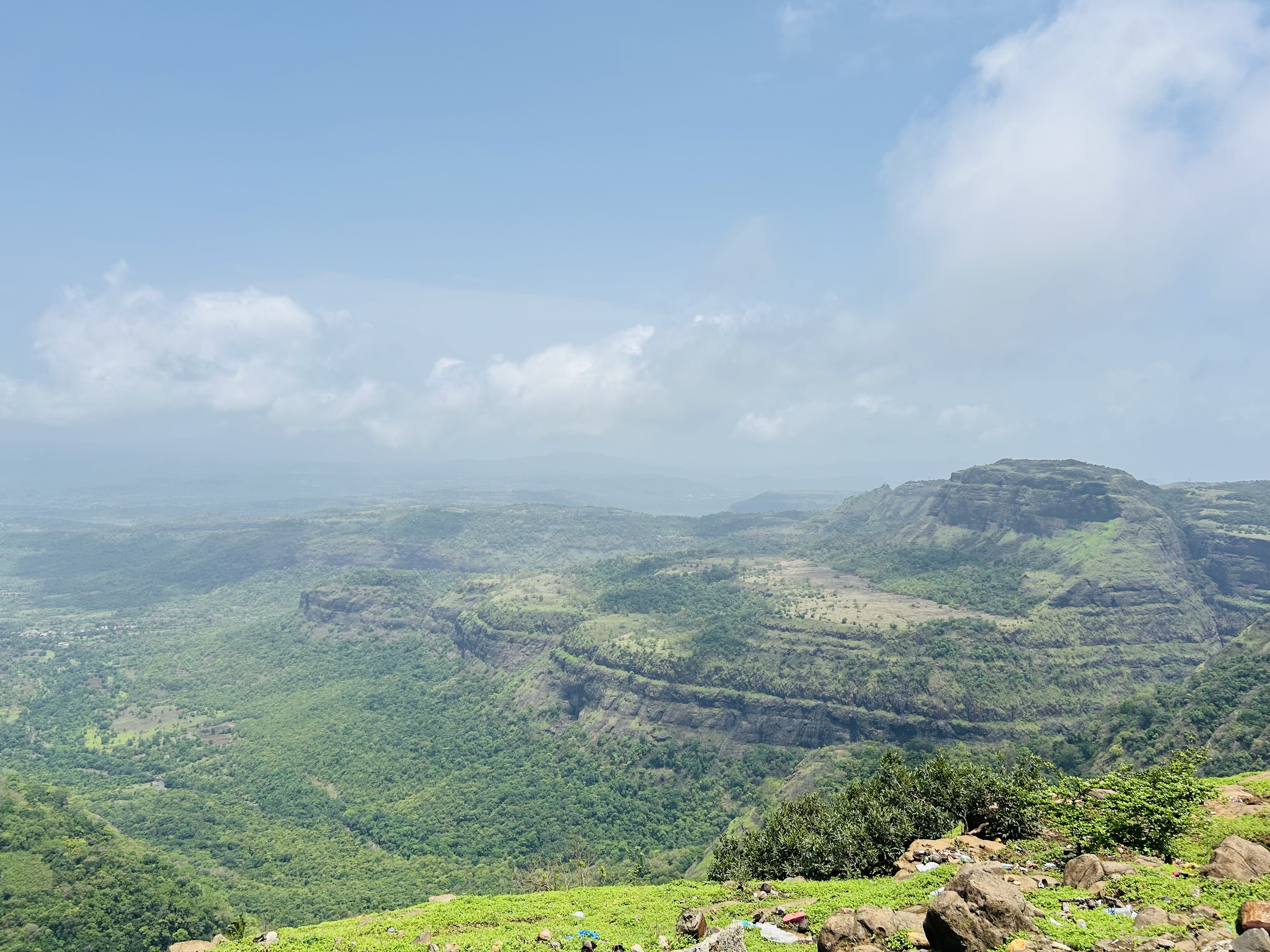
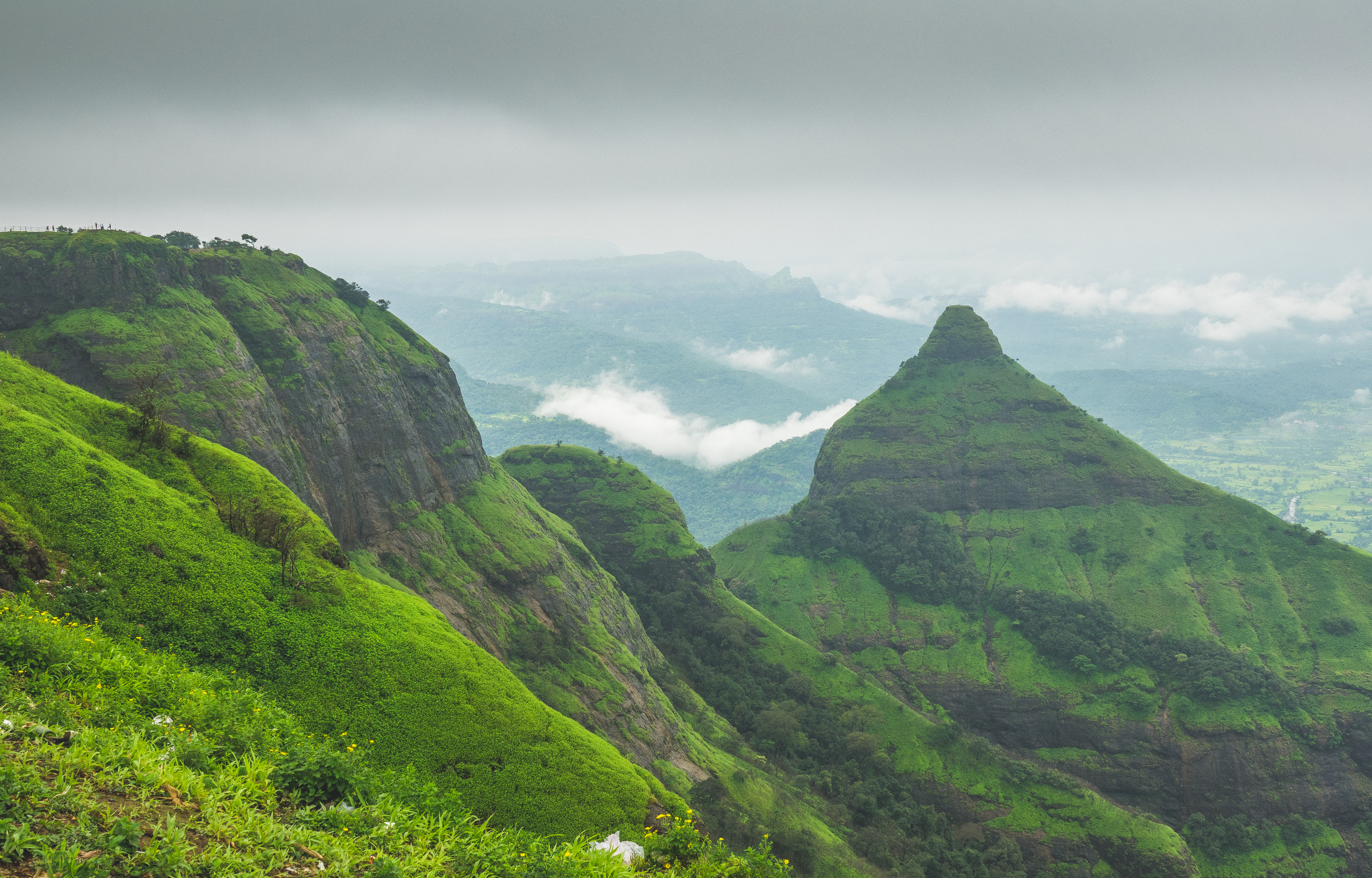
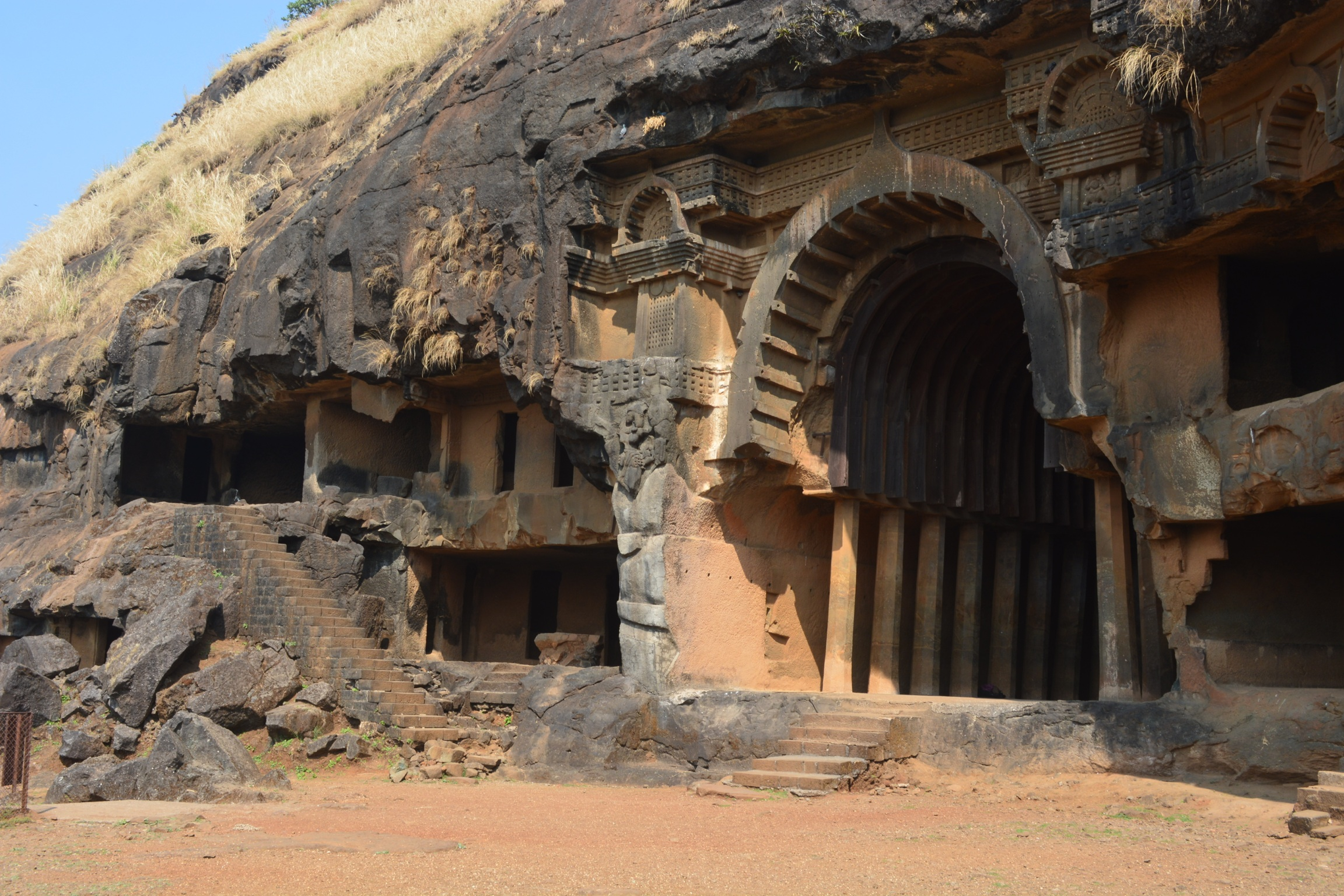
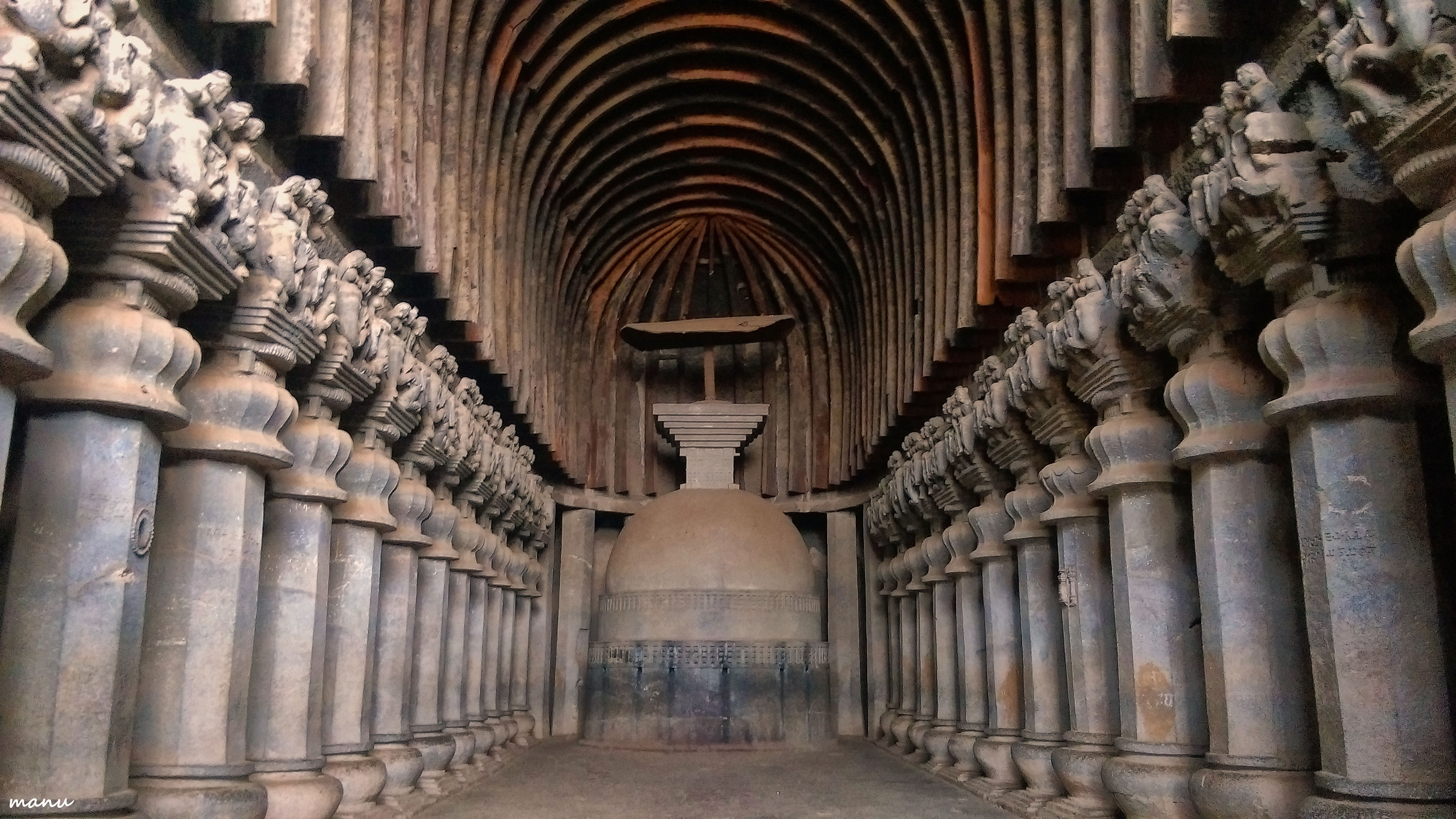
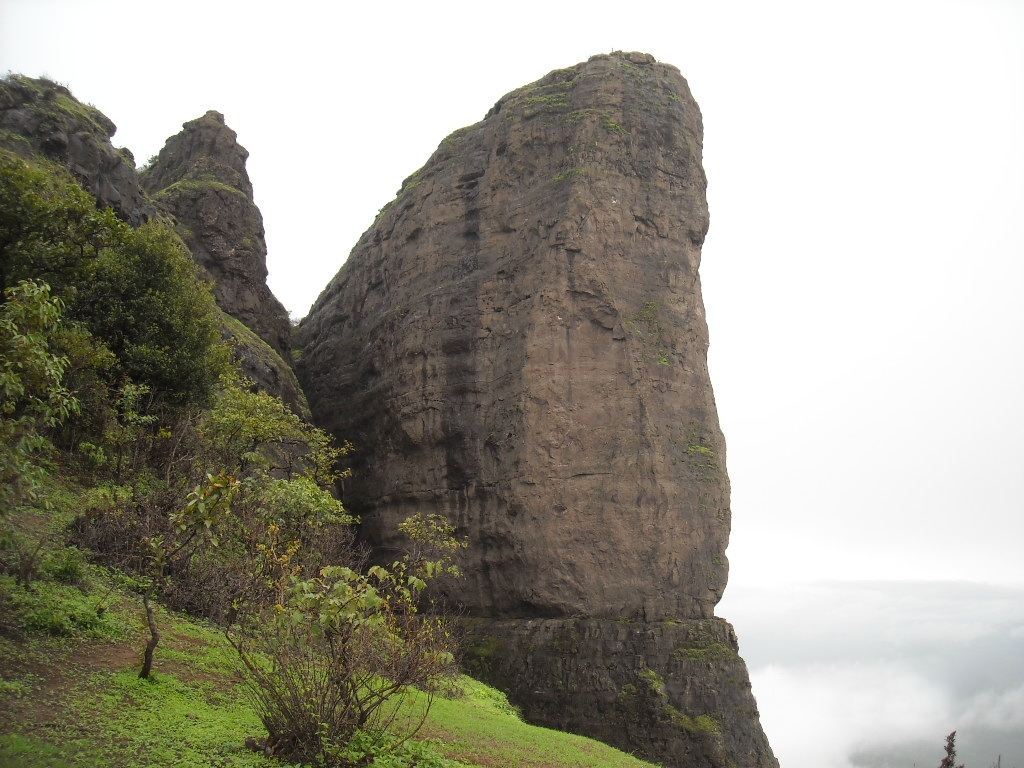
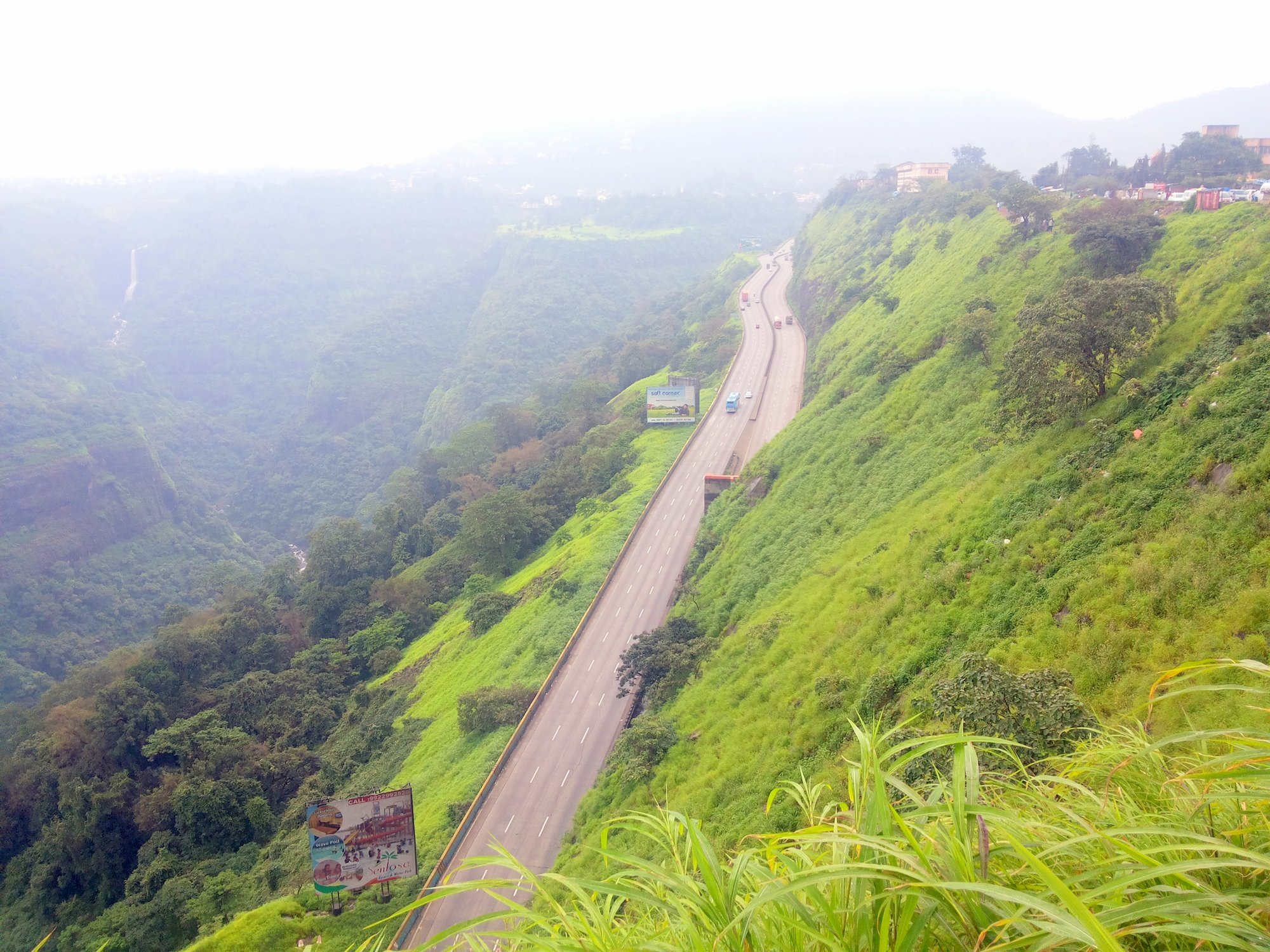
- Tiger Valley Bridge Tiger Point Lions Point Bhaja Caves Karla Caves Dukes Nose Khandala Ghat

- Location within Maharashtra Location within India Location within Asia
- Coordinates: 18.74806°N 73.40722°E
- Country: India
- State: Maharashtra
- District: Pune

Area
  - Total: 38 km^{2} (15 sq mi)
- Elevation: 624 m (2,047 ft)

Population (2011)
  - Total: 57,698
  - Density: 1,464/km^{2} (3,790/sq mi)

Languages
  - Official: Marathi
- Time zone: UTC+5:30 (IST)
- PIN: 410401
- Telephone code: 02114
- Vehicle registration: MH-12, MH-14

Lonavala-Khandala is a hill station and a municipal council in the Pune district, Maharashtra. It is about 64 km (40 miles) west of Pune and 96 km (60 miles) to the east of Mumbai. It is known for its production of the hard candy chikki and is also a major stop on the railway line connecting Mumbai and Pune. From the Pune suburbs, local trains are available from Pune Junction. The Mumbai-Pune Expressway and the Mumbai-Pune national highway both pass through Lonavala.

Lonavala is also home to INS Shivaji (formerly HMIS Shivaji), the Indian Navy's premier technical training institute. On 16 February 1945, the Establishment was commissioned as HMIS Shivaji and since then, the premier Technical Training Establishment of the Indian Navy trains officers.

== History ==
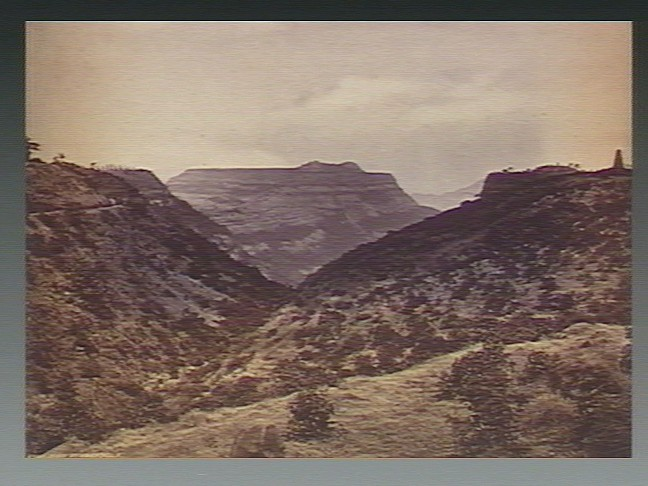
A view of Western Ghats in Lonavala, 1881

Present day Lonavala was a part of the Seuna (Yadava) dynasty. Later, the Mughals realised the strategic importance of the region and kept the region for an extended time. The forts in the region and the "Mavala" warriors played an important role in the history of the Maratha Empire and that of the Peshwas. In 1871, the Lonavala and Khandala hill stations were established by Lord Elphinstone, who was the Governor of Bombay Presidency at the time.

== Politics ==
The President of Lonavala Municipal Council is Smt. Surekha Nandkumar Jadhav and the Vice president is Shri. Sanjay Mohan Ghone.

== Demographics ==
As of 2011 India census, Lonavala had a population of 57,698. Males constituted 53.47% of the population and females 46.53%. The sex ratio in Lonavala is 870, lower than the state average of 929. Lonavala has a literacy rate of 89.33%, which is higher than the state average of 82.34%. The Male literacy rate is 93.4%, and the female literacy rate is 84.57%. 10.37% of the total population in Lonavala is of children under 6 years of age.

=== Religion ===
At the time of the 2011 Census of India, 75.18% of the population of Lonavala followed Hinduism, 10.13% Islam, 8.75% Buddhism, 2.67% Jainism, 2.32% Christianity and the remaining 0.96% of the population followed other religions or stated no religion.

Religion in Lonavala (2011)
1. Hinduism (75.2%)
2. Islam (10.1%)
3. Buddhism (8.75%)
4. Jainism (2.67%)
5. Christianity (2.32%)
6. Other or not stated (0.96%)

== Climate ==
Lonavala has an extreme version of tropical wet and dry climate which barely is borderline with a humid subtropical climate (CWa) due to the January mean temperature being shy of 18.9°C. It has an extreme wet and dry climate because it's quite dry during the dry months (mid October to may) while it's extremely wet from June to September. July and August rainfall values are higher than most well known cities annual rainfall.

Climate data for Lonavla
Month	Jan	Feb	Mar	Apr	May	Jun	Jul	Aug	Sep	Oct	Nov	Dec	Year
Mean daily maximum °C (°F)	27.9 (82.2)	30.3 (86.5)	33.6 (92.5)	37.8 (100.0)	35.9 (96.6)	31.6 (88.9)	26.7 (80.1)	24.5 (76.1)	28.6 (83.5)	31.4 (88.5)	30.1 (86.2)	26.8 (80.2)	30.4 (86.8)
Daily mean °C (°F)	18.9 (66.0)	20.8 (69.4)	24.1 (75.4)	28.7 (83.7)	29.6 (85.3)	27.3 (81.1)	24.4 (75.9)	22.9 (73.2)	24.3 (75.7)	24.8 (76.6)	22.3 (72.1)	19.1 (66.4)	23.9 (75.1)
Mean daily minimum °C (°F)	9.9 (49.8)	11.4 (52.5)	14.6 (58.3)	19.6 (67.3)	23.4 (74.1)	23.0 (73.4)	22.1 (71.8)	21.3 (70.3)	19.9 (67.8)	18.2 (64.8)	14.4 (57.9)	11.5 (52.7)	17.4 (63.4)
Average precipitation mm (inches)	4 (0.2)	2 (0.1)	3 (0.1)	18 (0.7)	67 (2.6)	666 (26.2)	1,733 (68.2)	1,147 (45.2)	495 (19.5)	111 (4.4)	16 (0.6)	3 (0.1)	4,265 (167.9)
Source: weather2stay

== Tourism ==
Lonavala and the adjacent Khandala are twin hill stations 622 metres (2,041 ft) above sea level, in the Sahyadri ranges that demarcate the Deccan Plateau and the Konkan coast. The hill stations sprawl over an approximate area of 38 square kilometres (15 mi^{2}). Tourism peaks during the monsoon season. The name Lonavala is derived from the words 'leni' which means caves and 'avali' which means series. i.e. 'a series of Caves' which is a reference to the many caves like Karla Caves, Bhaja Caves and Bedsa that are close to Lonavala. A trip to Lonavala and Khandala can be combined with sight-seeing visits of Karla, Bhaja and Bedsa caves and also the two fortresses, Lohagad and Visapur. Another place of interest is the Tungi fort, one of the forts captured by Malik Ahmad near the village of Karjat and was known for its natural strength. The Andharban trek begins from village Pimpri, passes through dense forests, valleys and waterfalls and ends in Bhira.

== Transport ==
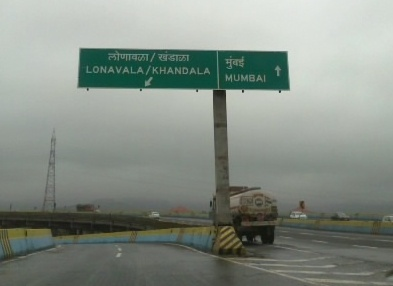
Mumbai-Pune Expressway

=== By road ===
Lonavala is on the Mumbai-Pune Expressway and is well-connected to several towns of Khopoli, Karjat, Talegaon Dabhade, etc.

=== By train ===
Lonavala is well-connected by train. Local trains run from Pune at 2-hour intervals. Those originating from Mumbai along the central line have Khopoli as their last station. Buses are available at regular intervals to complete the remaining 15 km of the journey to Lonavla from Khopoli bus station. It takes 2.5 hours by train from Mumbai and 1 to 1.5 hour from Pune. All trains, travelling between Mumbai and Pune, halt at Lonavala. Before the push-pull technology, trains from Mumbai used to halt at Karjat in Raigad District to attach banker locomotives before the train started the journey up the Western Ghats to reach Lonavala.

=== By air ===
The city of Aamby Valley, which lies near to Lonavala, has its own private airport. The nearest commercial airports are Pune International Airport at 64 km and second nearest commercial airport is D.B Patil international airport in Navi Mumbai, that is 65 km and Chhatrapati Shivaji Maharaj International Airport at 104 km. A seaplane service is also available between Juhu and Pawana Dam, which is 14 km away from Lonavala.

== Skywalk ==
Lonavala Tiger Point Skywalk is a 125 meter long, 6 meter wide, horseshoe-shaped glass-bridge skywalk costing Rs 909 cr at Tiger Point in Lonavala being constructed under parvatmala project.Lonavala Skywalk project also includes 5000 sqm rooftop cafe, 1000 seat amphitheatre, adventure sports, parking for 2000 motor bikes and 1600 cars. The road from A1 Chakki to the skybridge will also be widened into 11 km long elevated toll-free expressway between Mulshi and Lonavala. The construction will commence in 2025 and will be completed by June 2027.

== Tourism ==
=== Rajmachi Point ===
Rajmachi Point is located about 6.5 km from Lonavala. This point commands a view of Shivaji Maharaj's fort, Rajmachi (Royal terrakouioce), and the surrounding valley. Regular State Transport buses ply between Rajmachi Point and Lonavala from the State Transport Bus Stand. The Vaghjai Dari is also located here.

=== Rajmachi Fort ===
Rajmachi Fort is a historic fort close to Lonavala and attracts a lot of trekkers during the monsoon season. The fort also comprises two other forts - Shrivardhan Fort and Manaranjan Fort. Besides, the fort is known for the fireflies that lit up the surroundings in night

=== Ryewood Park & Shivaji Udyan ===
This is an extensive garden situated in Lonavla. The garden has a number of tall trees - some of which are very old. There is an old Shiva temple in the park.

=== Valvan Dam ===
Valvan Dam is a Britisher-built garden and is more than a century old. This dam has a garden at the foot of its wall and is 2 km from the town. The dam supplies water to the Khopoli power station at the foothills of the Sahyadris for generating electricity. The Kundali River feeds into the dam's reservoir.

=== Della Adventure Park ===
Della Adventure Park is India's largest adventure park situated in Lonavala hill station. The park is spread over an area of 36 acres. It is located at about 3,000 feet height above MSL. Della Adventure Park offers close to 52 adventure activities.

=== Lonavala Lake ===
Lonavala Lake is surrounded by natural scenery, about 1.6 km from the town. The lake dries up during the winter and summer months offering an expanse of green grass that is used by walkers and joggers. This place attracts tourists for its street food, including convenience food items like smoked corn on the cob, shaved ice (gola), vada pav, chaat, and hot ginger tea.

=== Duke's Nose ===
Duke's Nose stands 12 km from Lonavla, clearly visible from the highway while driving towards Mumbai. This landmark in Khandala is visited by hikers. Also known locally as Naagphani (Cobra's Hood), the cliff owes its name to the Duke of Wellington, whose ample nose it resembles.

=== Tiger's Leap ===
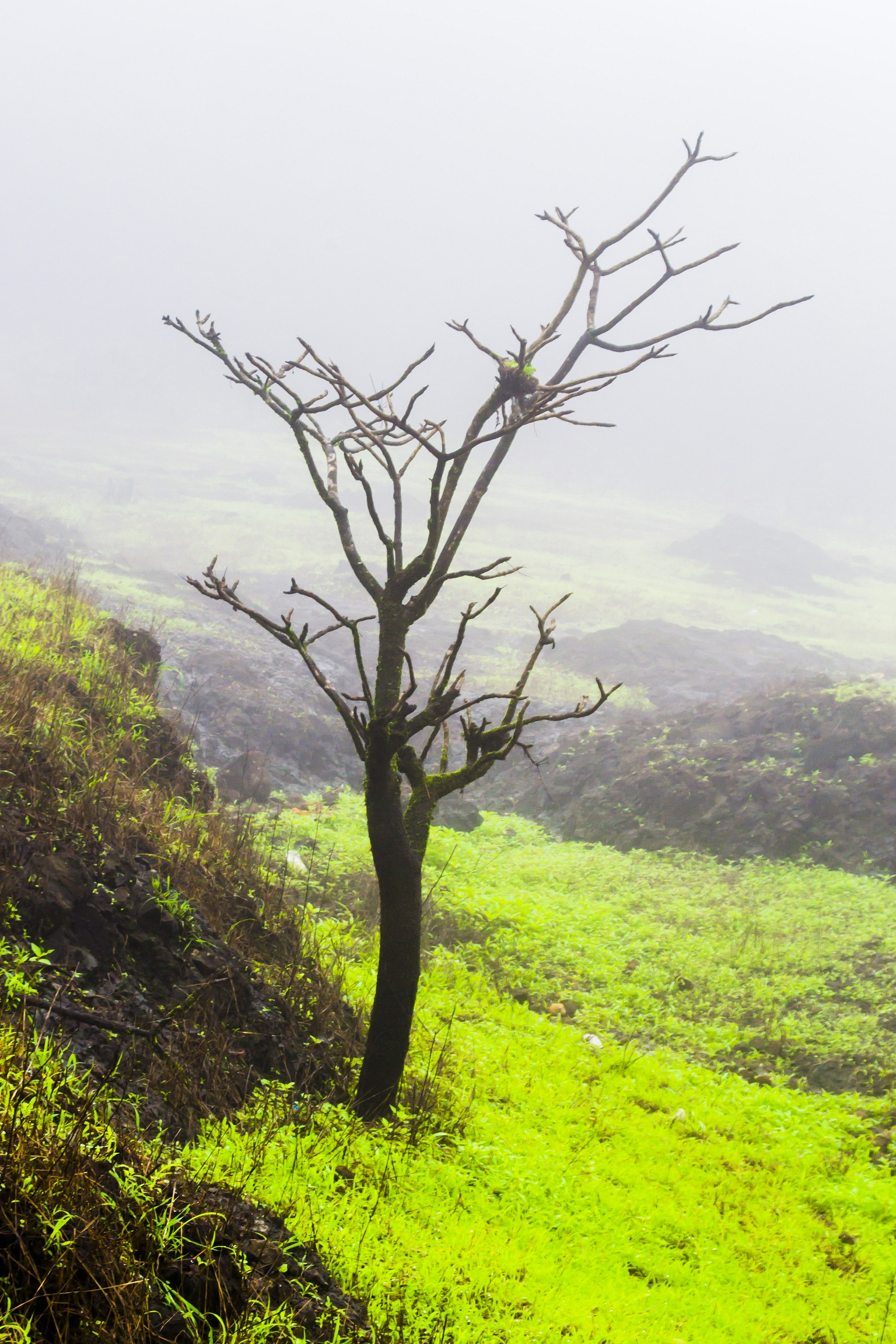
A place near Tiger Point

Tiger's Leap also known as Tiger's Point is a cliff-top with a sheer drop of over 650 m, giving an extensive view. Buses are available up to INS Shivaji and the remaining distance of about 1.6 km has to be covered on foot. Legend has it that while being chased by a tiger once, the Maratha Empire king Shivaji jumped into a ditch on the hill and the tiger leaped off it into the valley giving it the name of tiger's leap.

Just around the tiger's leap, there is a small waterfall active only during the monsoon. It serves the purpose of relaxing in the water better than Bushi Dam, as the force of the fall is higher. Also, after the brief steep descent, the fall becomes a stream with a fair amount of force to go all the way down to the base of the Tiger's Leap. Adventurers can trek down the stream whilst intermittently stepping back on land where the water current is too strong and the fall is steep.

=== Karla Caves ===
Karla Caves, located near Lonavala, is a complex of cave shrines built by Buddhist monks around 3rd to 2nd century B.C. A temple of Goddess Ekvira Devi is also present here.

=== Lohagad Fort ===
A climb of about 11.2 km from Malavali railway station takes you to the 'Iron Fort', once a battle-station of Shivaji. The fort commands a view of the surrounding hills and hamlets.

=== Visapur Fort ===
Adjacent to the Lohagad fort lies the visapur fort which is part of the Lohagad-Visapur fortification. Visapur Fort is larger and at a higher elevation than its twin- Lohagad. It was built during 1713-1720 CE by Balaji Vishwanath.

=== Bhushi Dam ===
A waterfall near the dam is located between Lonavala and I.N.S. Shivaji. Buses running on the I.N.S. Shivaji Road stop here.

=== Lion Point ===
This is a viewpoint midway between Bhushi Dam and Aamby Valley which overlooks a deep valley and mountains known for its roasted corn and onion fritters. This point does not have any lions but is named so because it is associated with the Lions Club of Lonavala.

=== Narayani Dham ===
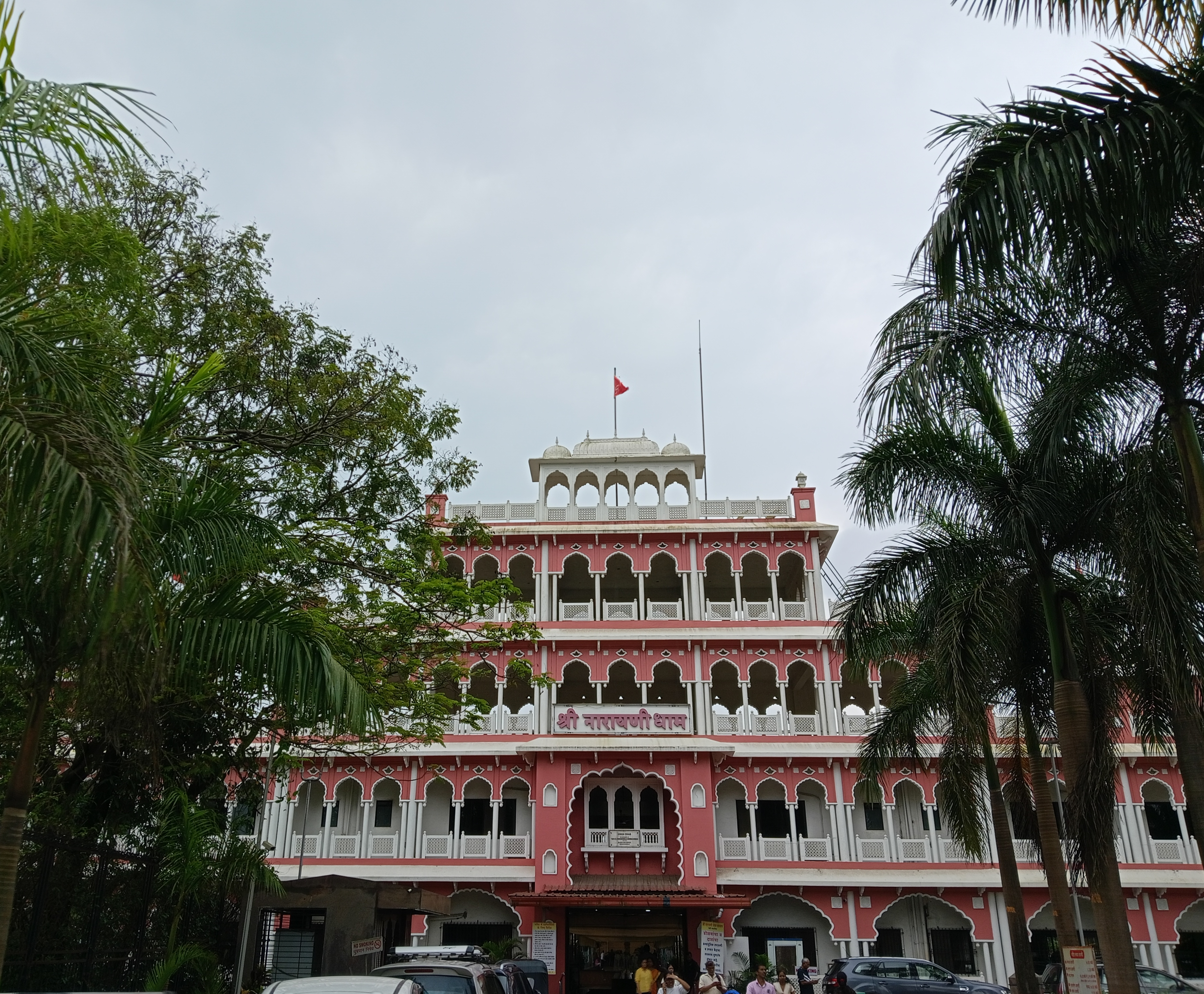
Narayani Dham Temple

Narayani Dham is a temple constructed in 2002 in honor of the Hindu Goddess Narayani. It is at a distance of 2 km from the Lonavla railway station. The temple has idols of Durga Mata, Salasar Balaji (Hanuman) and Ganapati housed in a marble structure.

=== Tungarli Dam ===
This lake and Dam comes to life during the Monsoon season, where some people climb the mountain top to the Dam. This dam was built during the British era and features a serene surrounding of trees and hillocks.

=== Shooting Point ===
Another viewpoint in the town of Khandala (Bazaar peth), provides views of the Rajmachi Fort and the valley. Also the home for the St. Mary's villa.

=== Kataldhar Waterfall ===
Kataldhar is a waterfall neer Rajmachi Fort off the Rajmachi Trekking route.

== Education ==
Some major educational institutes in Lonavala are:

- Sinhgad Institute of Technology Lonavala
- The Cathedral Vidya School, Lonavala
- Ryewood International School, Lonavala
- Gurukul High School (boarding school)
- Auxilium Convent School
- Don Bosco School and Junior College, Lonavala
- Adv. Bapusaheb Bhonde High School, Lonavala
- Samundra Institute of Maritime Studies (SIMS)
- Kohinoor Business School-Kohinoor Global Campus
- DC High School and Jr. College
- Dr. B. N. Purandare Vidyalay High School
- Institute For Future Education Entrepreneurship And Leadership
- V. P. S. HighSchool
- D.P. Mehata Jr College
- Kaivalyadhama Health and Yoga Research Center
- Kendriya Vidyalaya, INS Shivaji, Lonavala
- Sadhana Institute, Old Khandala Road, Lonavala
- Kaivalya Vidya Niketan, Kaivalyadhama Lonavala. CBSE Board
- The Great Eastern Institute Of Maritime Studies, Lonavala
- Society of Saint Mary Virgin in India, Shanti Sadan School Lonavala

== Gallery ==
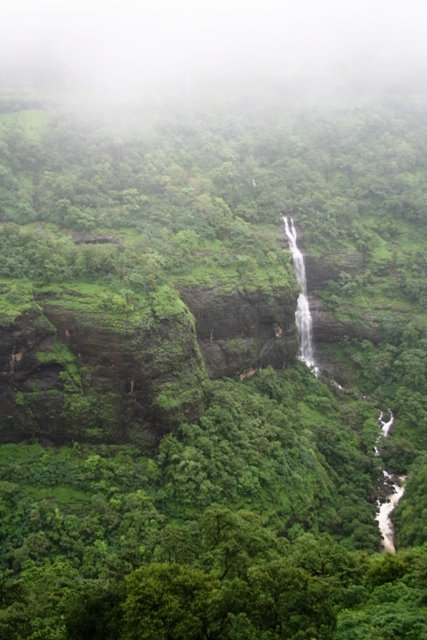
A waterfall on the way to Lonavala.

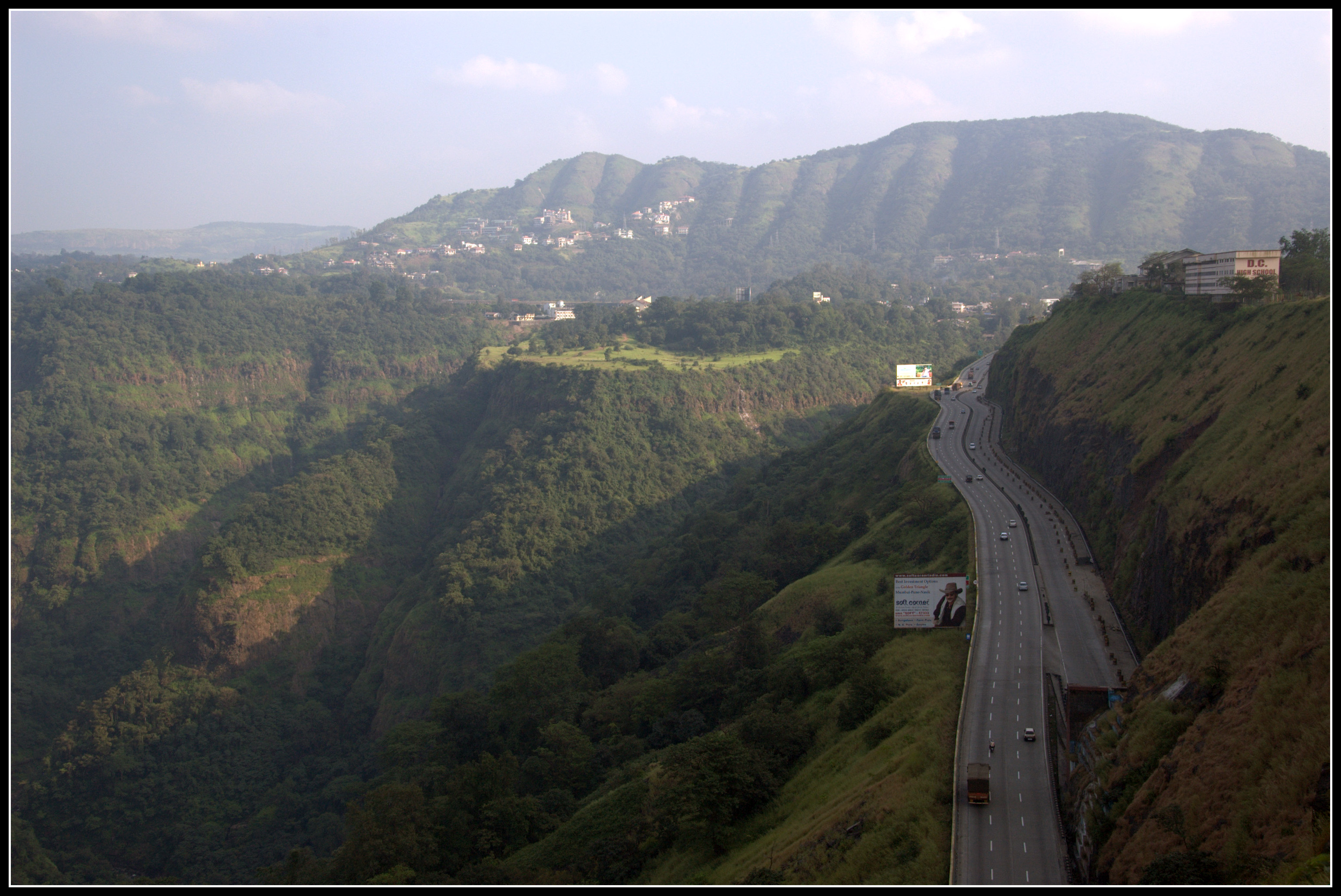
View of Western ghats, from Rajmachi

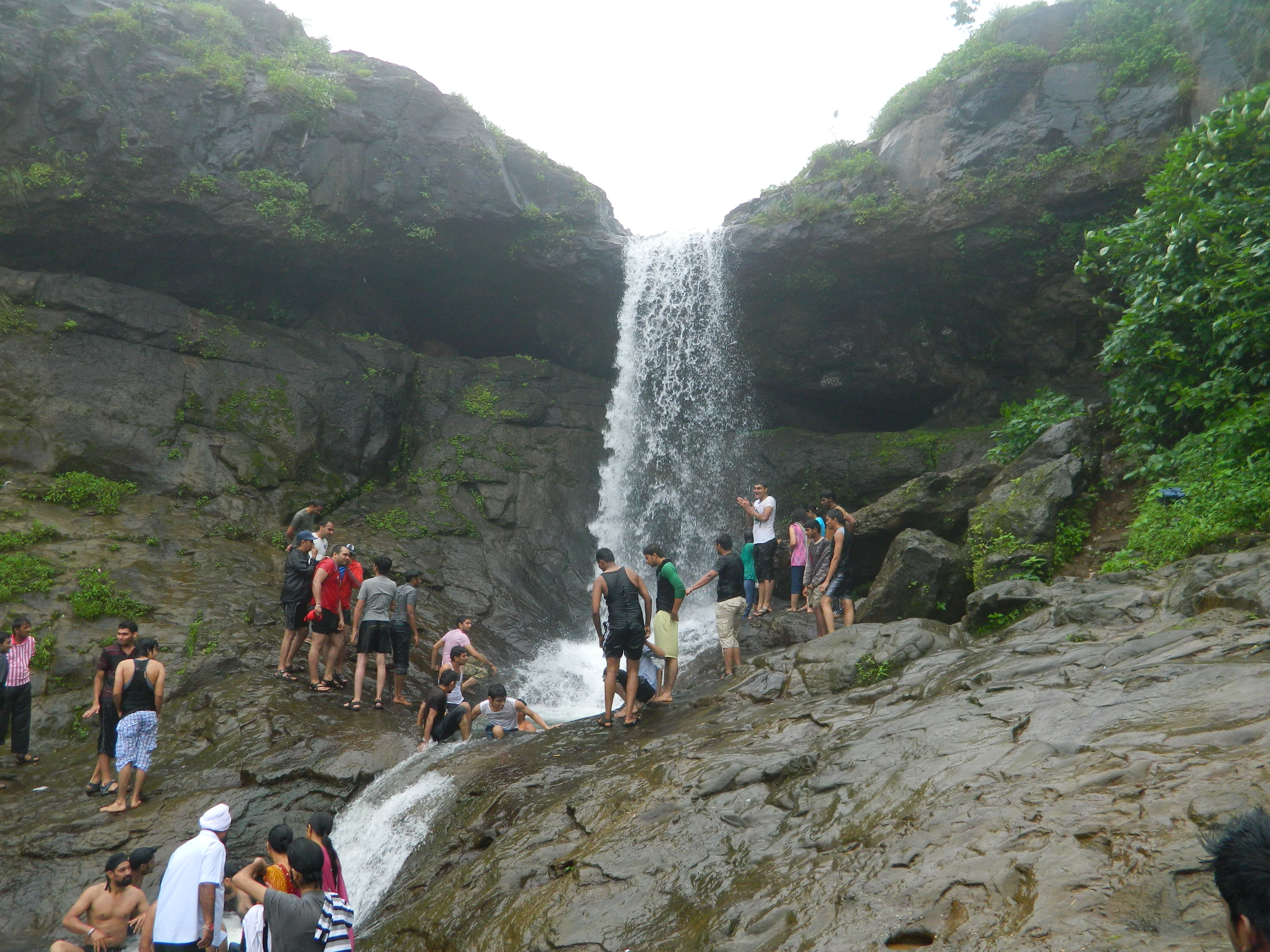
Tiger point during the rainy season

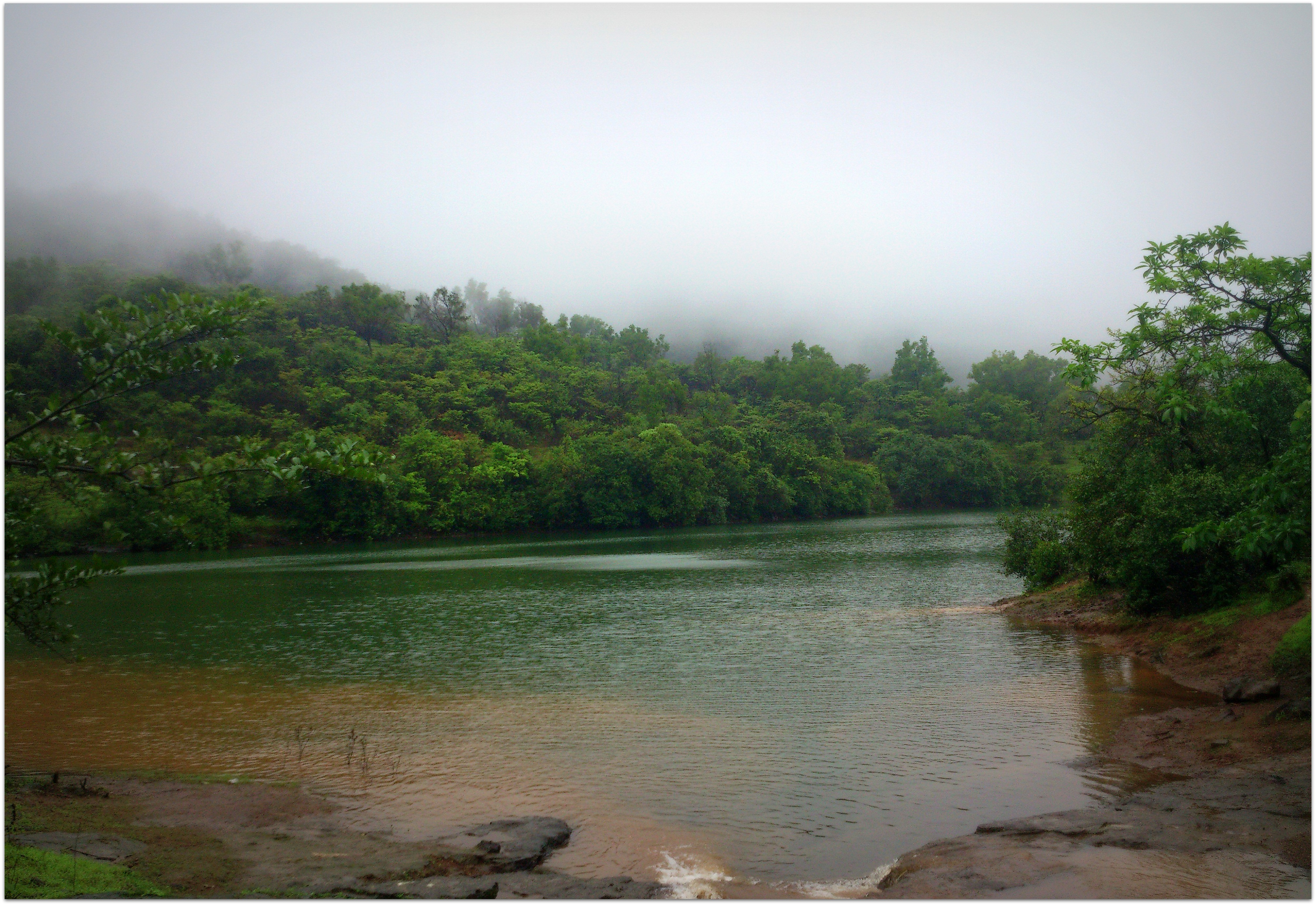
Bhushi Dam - Lonavala

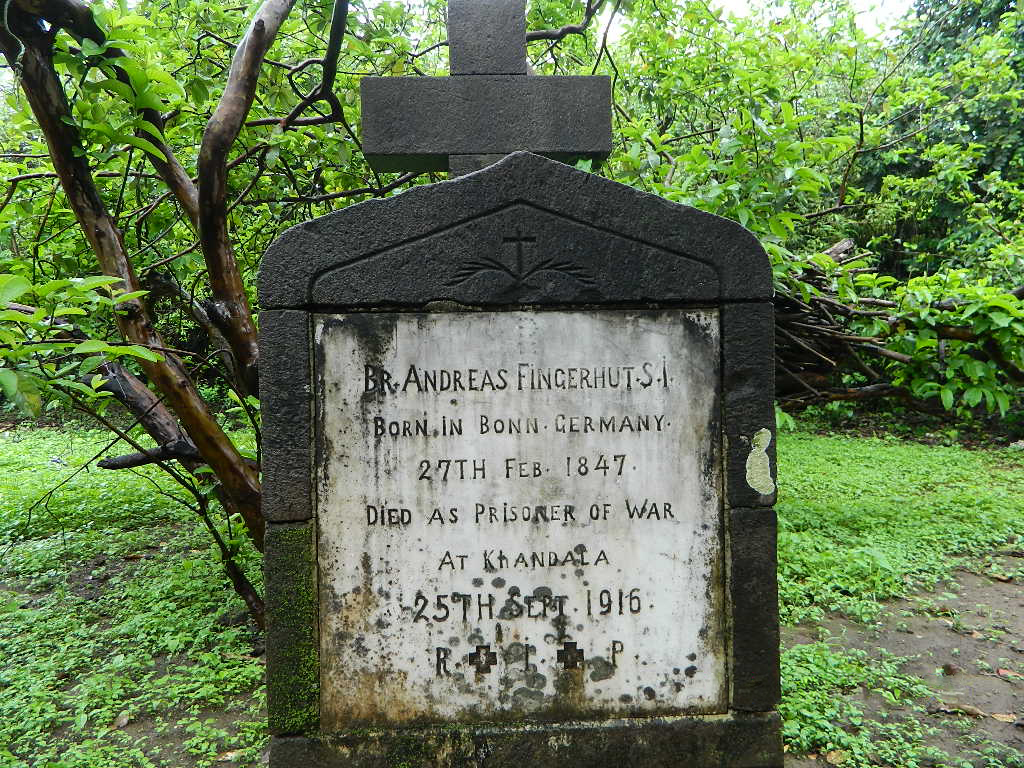
Tombstone of Jesuits German Priests 01

== See also ==
- Lonavala chikki
