= Pale Jain cave =

Ancient rock-cut cave

Pale Jain Cave
- Pale Jain Cave
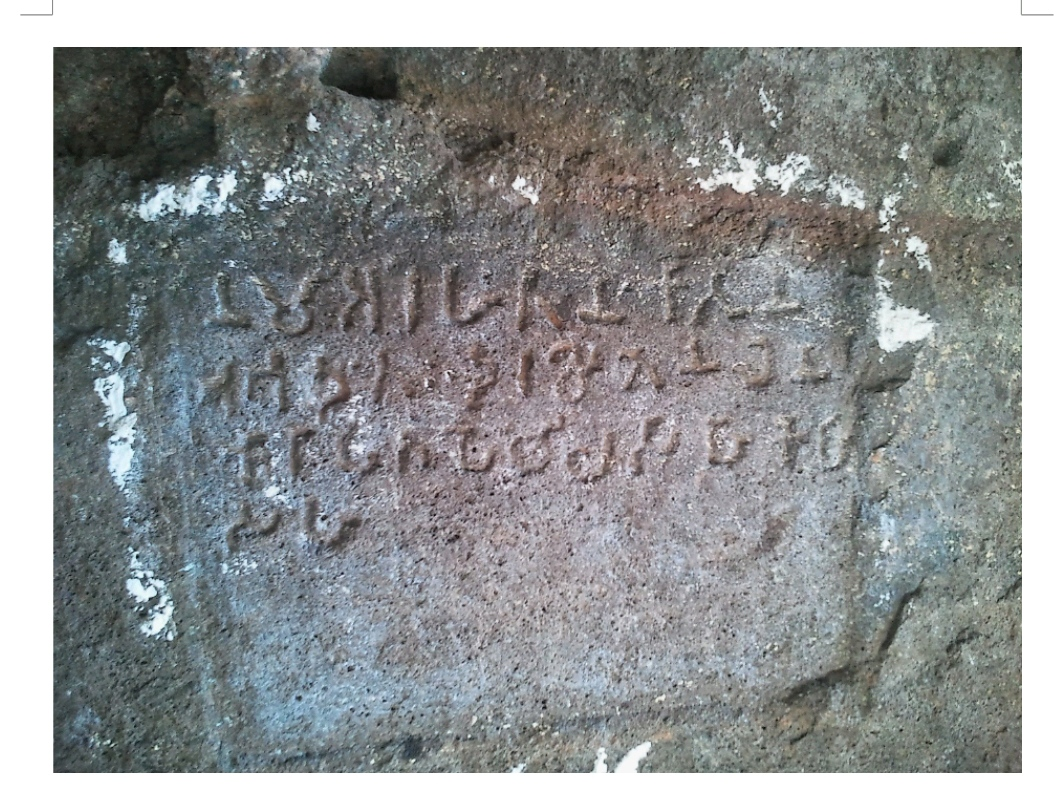
- Pale Jain Cave

Religion
- Affiliation: Jainism

Location
- Location: Pale, Pune

Architecture
- Type: Rock-cut monuments
- Established: 2nd century BCE
- Monument: 1

Pale Jain Cave is an ancient rock-cut cave near Pale village in the Pune district of Maharashtra, India. The cave contains an early Brahmi inscription and a rock-cut water cistern. The inscription, dated palaeographically to approximately the 1st–2nd century BCE, begins with an invocation to an Arhat and has been interpreted by archaeologists as evidence of the presence of Jainism in Maharashtra during this period.

== Location ==
The cave is situated near Pale village in the Maval region, in the hills near Kamshet. It lies in a V-shaped valley in a hilly area of the Western Ghats.

== Cave ==
The cave is largely natural, having been formed in the basaltic rock and subsequently modified by human activity. It contains a water cistern and a small chamber. A platform and rock-cut steps are associated with the interior of the cave. The cistern is particularly significant because the inscription is carved on the rock surface above it. The combination of a secluded cave, water installation and inscription indicates that the site was used for religious purposes.

== Inscription ==
The inscription at Pale is written in early Brahmi characters and in a form of Prakrit. It begins with an invocation to an Arhat. Archaeologist H. D. Sankalia and epigraphist Shobhana Gokhale studied the inscription and dated it palaeographically to approximately the 1st–2nd century BCE. The use of the term Arhat was considered significant because the term was specifically associated with a Jain Tirthankara in this context. The inscription consequently provides early epigraphic evidence for the presence of Jainism in Maharashtra. The inscription records a donation associated with the excavation of the cave and its water cistern. It is therefore also evidence for the patronage of religious establishments in the region during the early historic period.

The inscription at Pale mentions Namo Arahatanam (नमो अरहतानं) or Namo Arahantanam (नमो अरहंतानं), the first line of the Namokara Mantra. The Lohagadwadi caves, located about 25 kilometres from the Pale Jain Caves, also contain an inscription bearing the same invocation.

== Historical significance ==
The Pale inscription is important in the history of Jainism in Maharashtra because it provides evidence for Jain religious activity in the region at approximately the same time that Buddhist establishments were developing elsewhere in the Deccan. A later archaeological review described the inscription as evidence of the prevalence of Jainism in Maharashtra during the early historic period.

The Pale evidence is particularly significant because Jainism is better documented archaeologically in Maharashtra from later periods. The early inscription demonstrates that Jain religious communities were present in the region by the late centuries BCE.

== Related inscription at Lohagad ==
A later Jain inscription discovered at Lohagad near Lohagadwadi has been compared with the Pale inscription. The Lohagad inscription also begins with an invocation to the Arhats and mentions a donor identified as Indra Rakhita. The similarity has led scholars to associate the two inscriptions with the same religious milieu and possibly the same donor.

The Pale and Lohagad inscriptions together provide evidence for an early Jain presence in the hill country of present-day Pune district.

== See also ==
- Lohagadwadi caves
- Brahmi script
- Hathigumpha inscription
