= Visapur Fort =

Fort in Pune district, Maharashtra, India

Visapur fort
- Visapur, Maharashtra
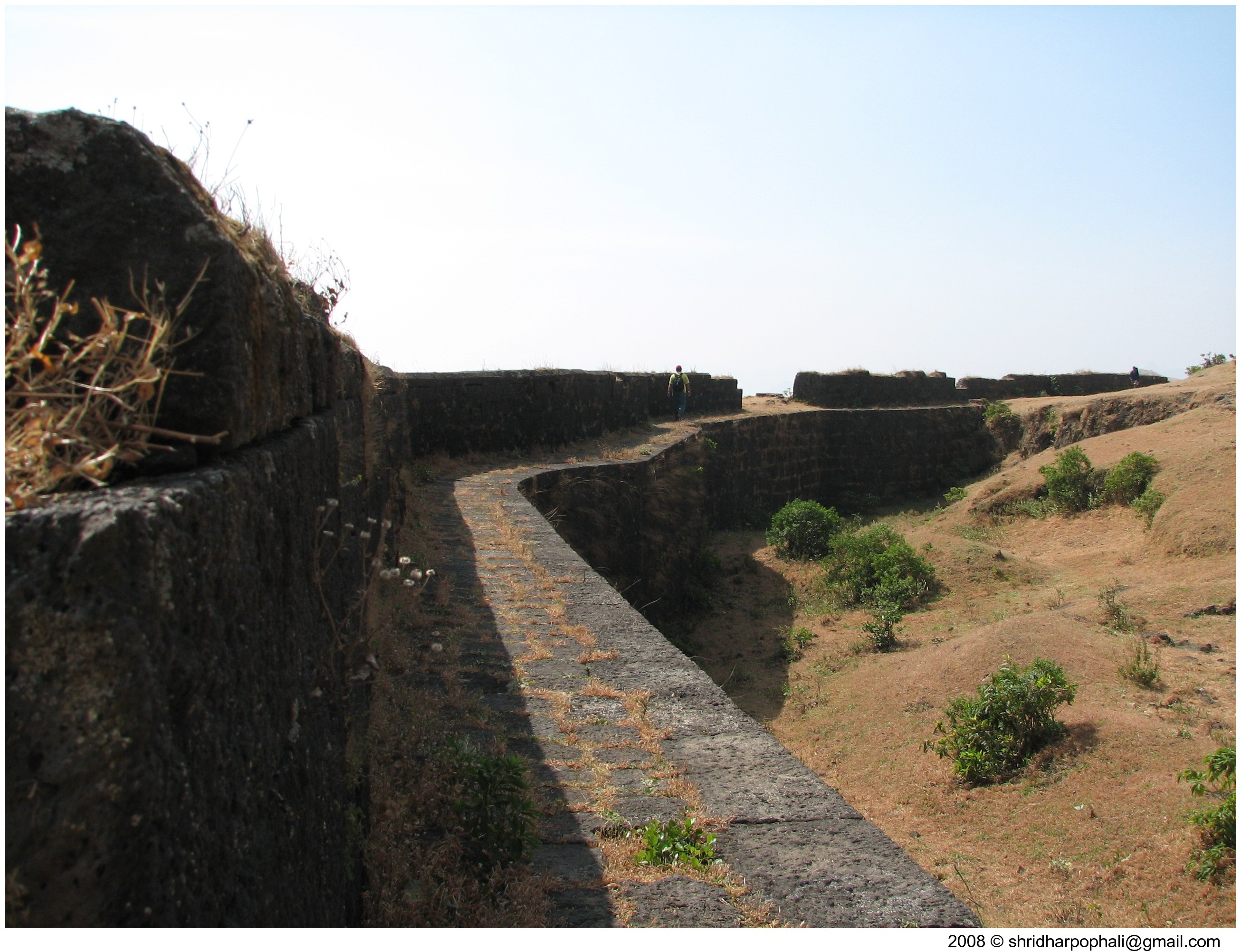
- Visapur fort walls

Site information
- Type: Hill fort
- Owner: Government of India
- Controlled by: Maratha Empire (c. 1720-1818); United Kingdom: East India Company (1818-1857); India (1857-1947); India (1947-)
- Open to the public: Yes
- Condition: Ruins

Location
- Shown within Maharashtra
- Coordinates: 18°43′21″N 73°29′24″E
- Height: 1,084 m (3,556 ft) ASL

Site history
- Built: 1713-1720 CE
- Built by: Balaji Vishwanath
- In use: 1713-1818
- Materials: Stone
- Demolished: 1818

Garrison information
- Past commanders: Balaji Vishwanath

Visapur Fort (also called Visapoor Fort) is a hill fort near Visapur village in Maharashtra, India. It is a part of the Lohagad-Visapur fortification.

== Location ==
It is located in Pune district, 5 to 6 km from Malavli Railway station out of which 3 km is steep road. It has an elevation of 1084 meters above sea level. It is built on the same plateau as Lohagad.

== History ==
It was built during 1713-1720 CE by Balaji Vishwanath, the first Peshwa of Maratha Empire. Visapur fort was built much later than Lohagad but the histories of the two forts are closely linked.

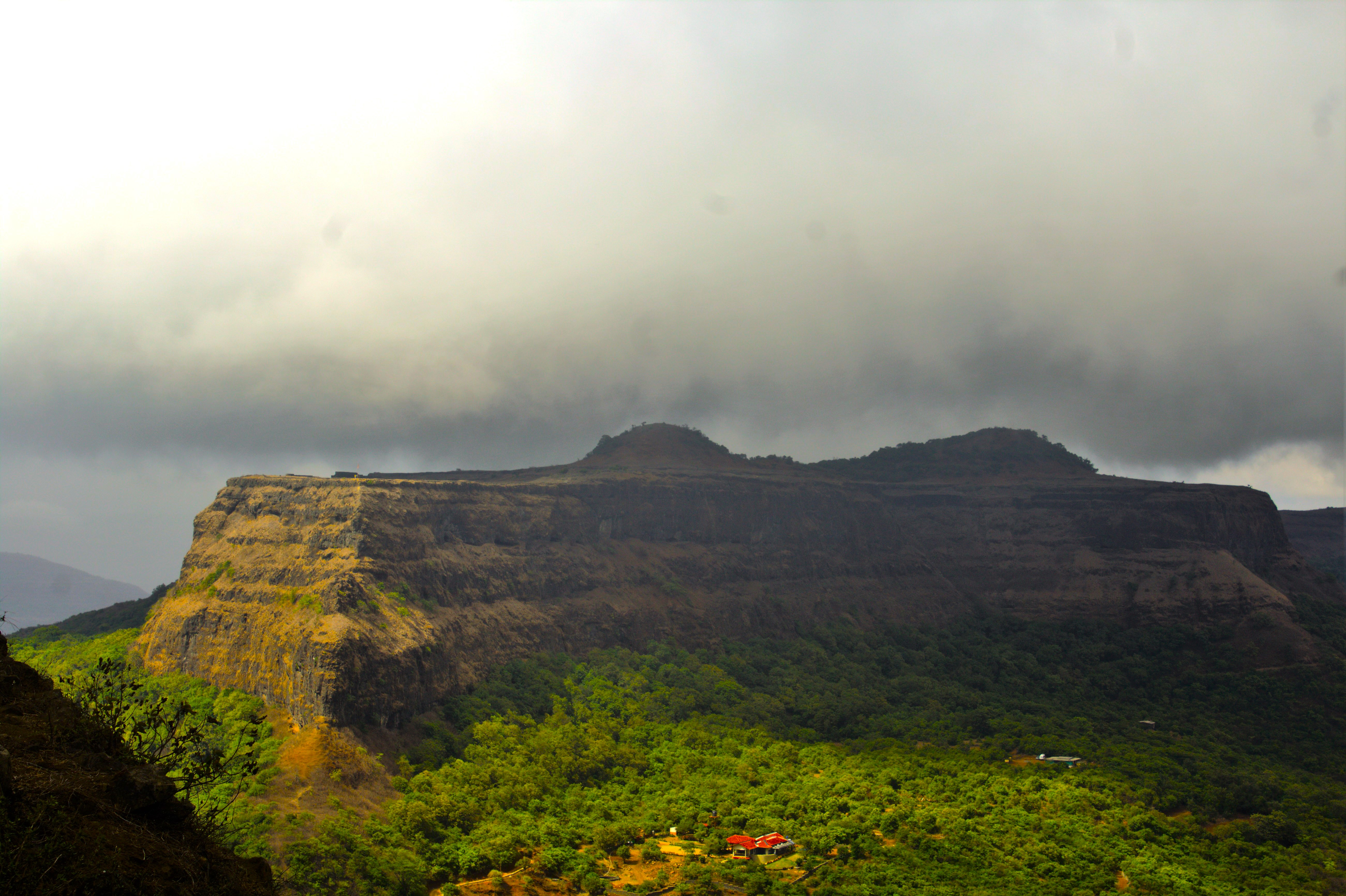
Sunlit view of Visapur Fort

In 1818, when reducing the Peshwa's forts, the strength of Lohagad and its fame as the treasury of the Maratha kingdom, caused the English to make special preparations for its attack. A detachment of 380 European and 800 native soldiers, with a battering train, summoned from Konkan, were joined by artillery from Chakan, and two other British battalions. On 4 March 1818, Visapur was attacked and occupied.

Making use of its higher elevation and proximity to Lohagad, the British troops set up their cannons on Visapur and bombarded Lohagad, forcing the Marathas to flee. Thus, in 1818, Lohagad-Visapur was taken over by the British in 1818 AD and placed under the command of a Colonel Prother. Considering, the strategic importance of Visapur, both the north (Konkan) and the south (Deccan) gateways were blown up, and except a few huts, nothing was left standing. In contrast, most of Lohagad fort is still intact.

== Major Features ==
Visapur Fort is larger and at a higher elevation than its twin fort- Lohagad. Within the fort are caves, cisterns of water, a decorated arch and old houses. These two roofless buildings surrounded by outer or veranda walls said to have once been Government offices. The ruins of a large stone-built house are known as the Peshwa's palace. In addition to a huge carving of Hanuman, there are also several temples dedicated to him scattered all over the place.

There is a well which local legend says was built by the Pandavas. In 1885, near the north wall there was an iron gun ten feet long and of four-inch bore, marked with the Tudor Rose and Crown, flanked by the letters E. R. This is probably a gun of Queen Elizabeth's reign probably taken as bounty from an English ship and presented to the Peshwa by Kanhoji Angre or some other commander of the Maratha Navy. Like other guns on the fort it has been disabled by breaking off its trunnions. Close to it are the remains of an old Mahadev shrine.

Unlike the inner structure, majority of its wall is still intact. At a moderate pace, it takes two hours to walk along the winding Visapoor walls. It is high and strengthened by towers along the west face. In other parts, the wall varies from 3 feet thick fortification, backed by masonry platforms where the slope of the hill is easy, to a mere parapet of dry stone where the plateau ends in a precipice. Two massive bastions still flank the ruined central gate.

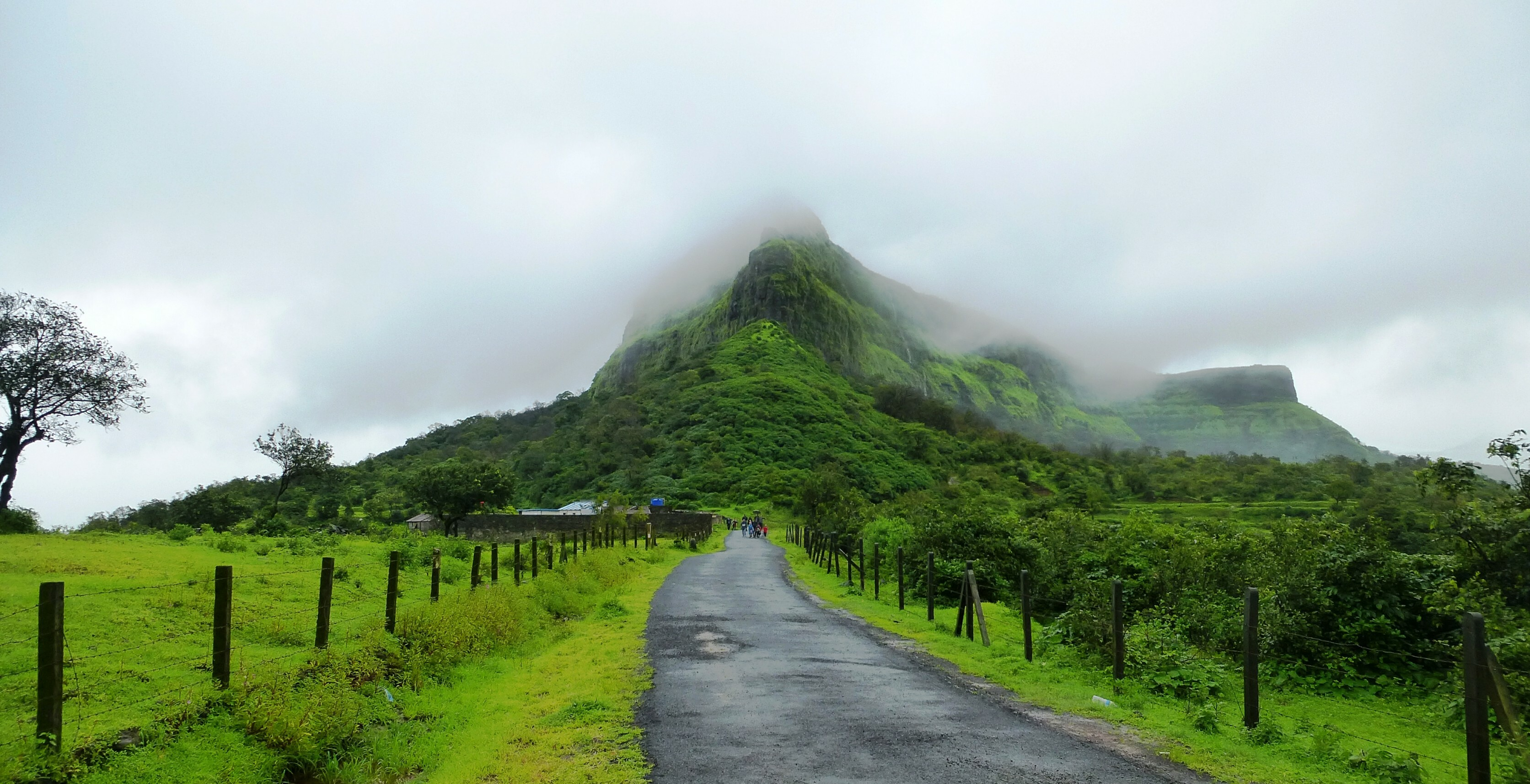
Visapur in Monsoon

== Gallery ==
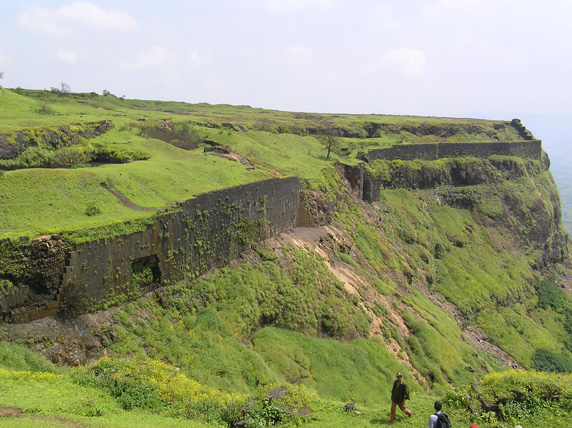
Visapur fort walls from outside

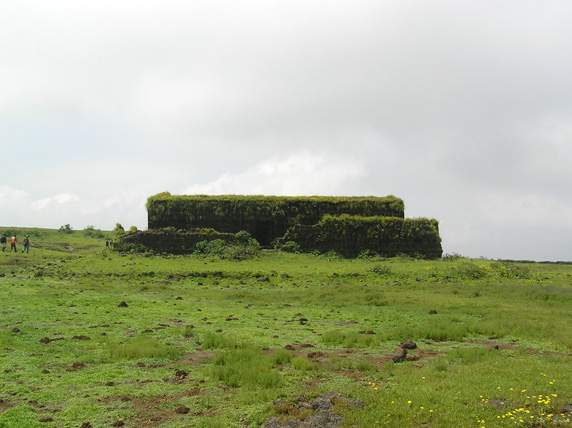
Ruins of the Peshwa's Palace, Visapur fort

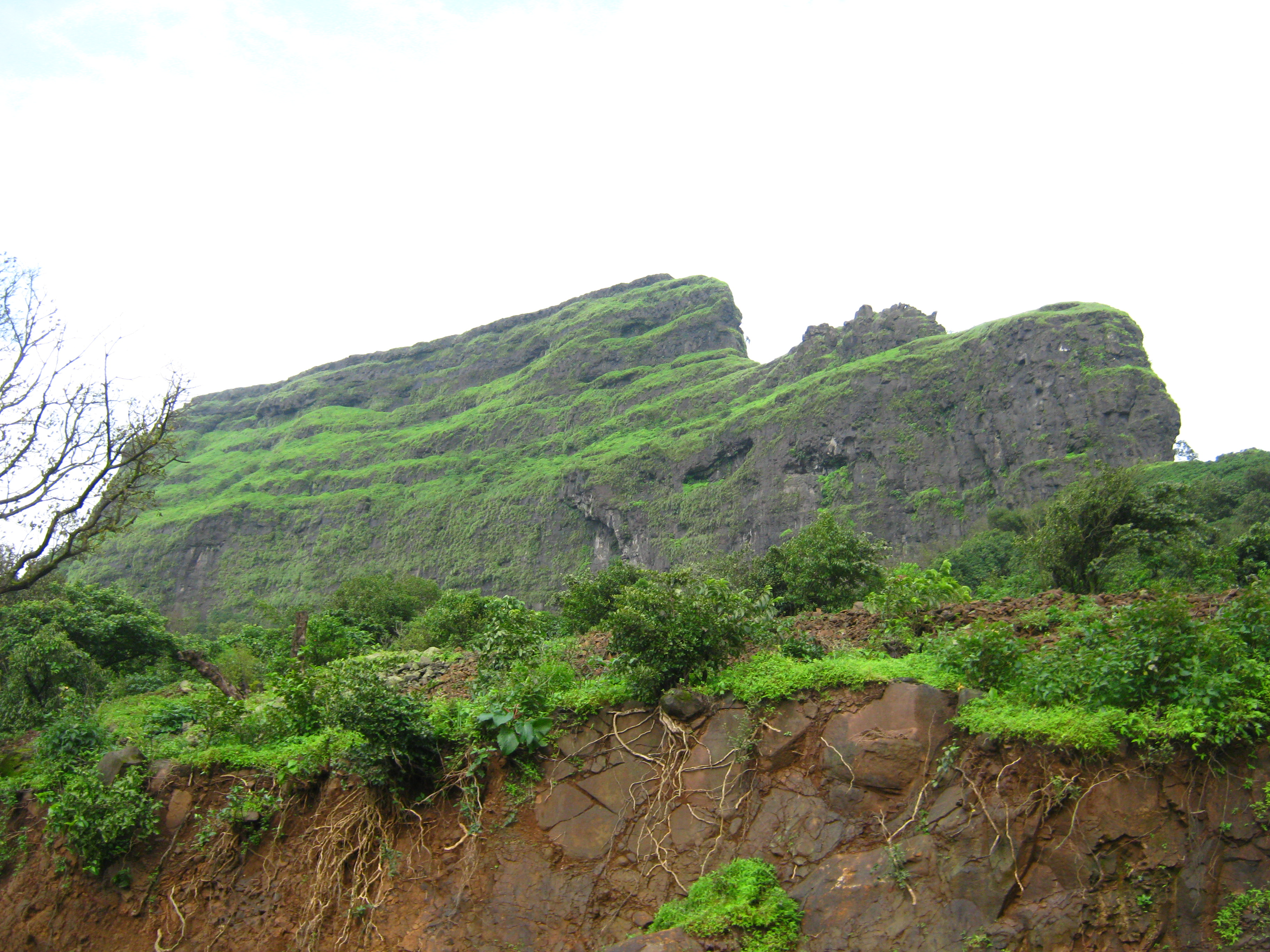
Visapur

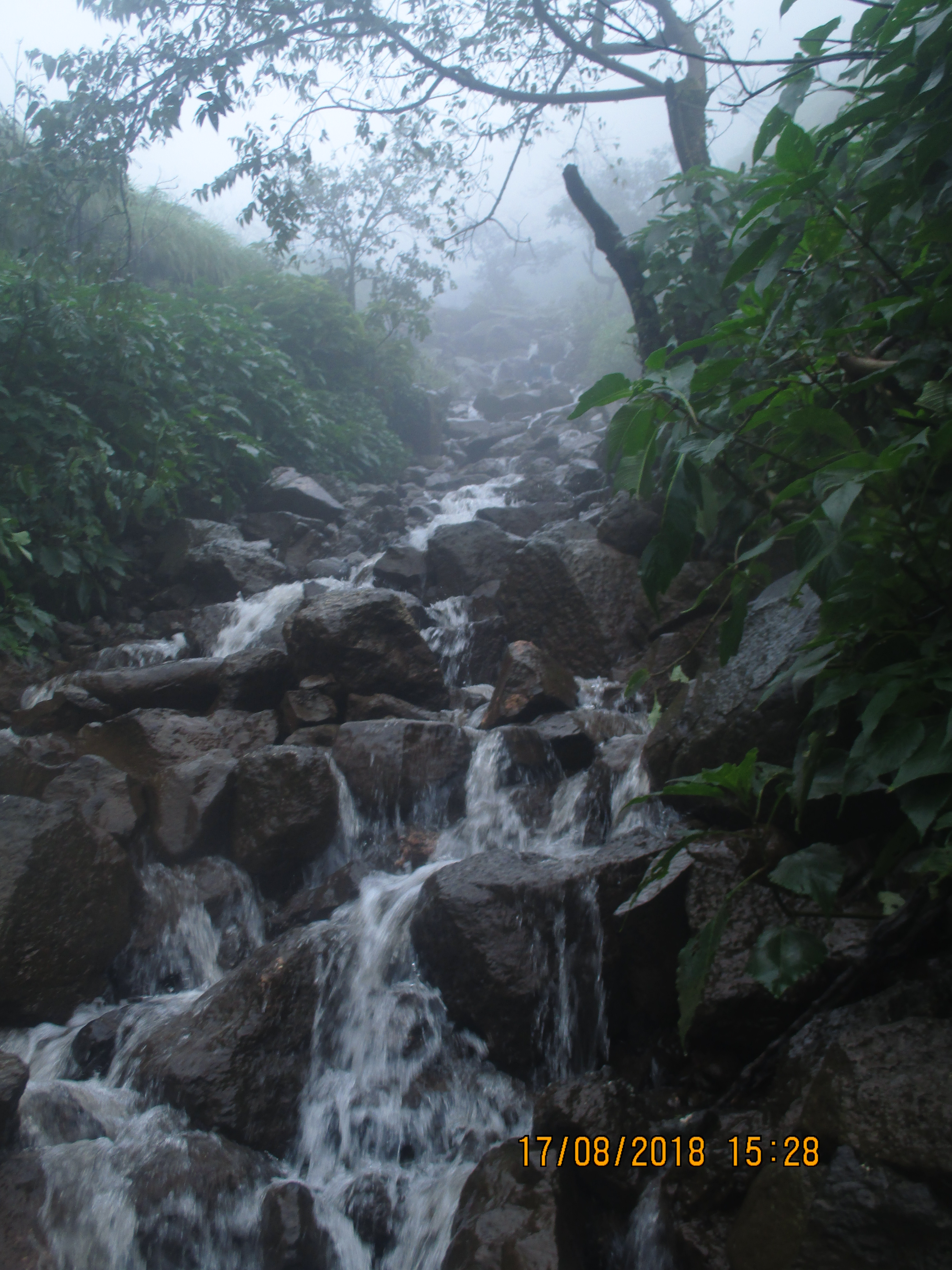
Trek way near from Lohgad

== Nearby attractions ==
- Bhaja Caves - 2 km (1.2 mi) from Malavli, once home to Buddhist monks.
- Karla Caves
- Lonavala - 20 km (12 mi), a famous and scenic hill station.
- Aamby Valley City - 22 km (14 mi) from Lonavala.
- Lohagad

== How to reach ==
The cheapest and convenient way to reach the fort is via railways. The nearest railhead to Visapur Fort is Malavli station (approx. 5 km) which is well connected to Mumbai, Lonavala, and Pune via local trains. From Malavli station shared auto/taxi are available for the base village of Visapur Fort

== See also ==
- List of forts in Maharashtra
