= Lohagadwadi caves =

Ancient rock-cut cave

- Lohagadwadi caves
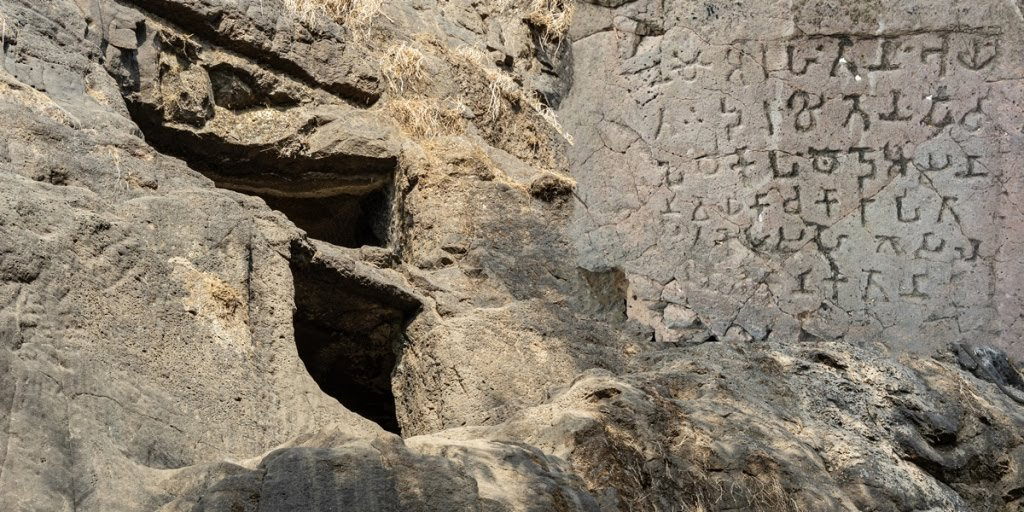
- Lohagadwadi Jain inscription

Religion
- Affiliation: Jainism

Location
- Location: Lohagad, Pune

Architecture
- Type: Rock-cut monuments
- Established: 2nd century BCE
- Monument: 1

Lohagadwadi caves are a group of rock-cut caves at Lohagad, near Lohagadwadi in Pune district, Maharashtra, India. The caves are associated with an early Jain inscription in Brahmi script that begins with the invocation Namo arahaṁtānaṁ and names a donor, Bhadaṁta Idarakhita. The inscription has been dated palaeographically to approximately the 2nd-1st century BCE and has close affinities with the earlier Jain inscription from the Pale cave in Maval.

== Location and caves ==
The Lohagadwadi cave group is located on the eastern side of Lohagad fort, on the cliff near Lohagadwadi village. The group consists of seven small rock-cut excavations arranged at three levels. The caves are relatively plain and lack the elaborate sculptural decoration found at many of the larger Buddhist cave complexes of the Western Deccan. Some of the caves contain rock-cut benches. Caves 1 and 4 have benches carved along the walls, while cave 7 contains a large rock-cut water cistern. The archaeological features correspond with several of the facilities mentioned in the inscription.

== Inscription ==
An inscription was noticed in 2019 on the outside wall of one of the rock-cut caves on the eastern cliff of Lohagad. It is written in Brahmi script and in Prakrit, with linguistic features influenced by Sanskrit. The inscription consists of six lines and is approximately 46 by 32 centimetres within a prepared rectangular surface. The inscription begins with Namo arahaṁtānaṁ, an invocation to the Arhats, and records the name of Bhadaṁta Idarakhita. The text also mentions a water cistern (*poḍhi*), benches, a path and a railing or balustrade (*veyikā*). The excavators associate these donations with features of the cave group.

The discovery was reported publicly in October 2019. Contemporary reporting identified the inscription as an early Jain inscription and noted its similarity to the inscription at the Pale caves. The report also recorded the identification of the donor as Idarakhita and described the inscription as approximately 50 centimetres wide and 40 centimetres high, with six lines.

== Date ==
On palaeographic grounds, Pradhan, Kurkute and Kale assign the Lohagadwadi inscription to approximately the 1st century BCE. They compare its letter forms with early Brahmi inscriptions, including the inscription at Nanaghat, and note similarities with the Pale inscription. They also cite the possibility that the Pale inscription may date as early as the end of the 2nd century BCE. The date applies primarily to the inscription rather than providing an exact construction date for every cave in the group. The excavators describe the Lohagadwadi caves as belonging to the early phase of rock-cut activity associated with Jainism in Maharashtra.

== Jain affiliation ==
The principal evidence for a Jain association is the inscription's opening invocation to the Arhats and its close relationship with the Pale inscription, which also begins with an invocation to the Arhats and names Idarakhita. The excavators regard the Lohagadwadi inscription as an important early Jain inscription in Maharashtra.

The attribution of the entire cave group to Jainism is nevertheless not completely certain. The caves lack distinctive Jain iconography, and the architecture of early rock-cut establishments can be difficult to assign to a particular religious tradition solely from architectural remains. Pradhan, Kurkute and Kale therefore discuss the Jain identification in qualified terms, noting that if the cave group is attributed to Jainism, it would provide evidence for early Jain rock-cut activity in the region.

This qualification is significant because earlier scholarship has disagreed over the religious interpretation of the related Pale inscription. The 2020 study notes that Vidya Dehejia proposed a Buddhist interpretation of the Pale evidence, while H. D. Sankalia argued for its Jain affiliation; S. Nagaraju likewise discussed the difficulty of distinguishing early Jain and Buddhist rock-cut establishments on architectural grounds.

== Bhadaṁta Idarakhita ==
The donor named in the Lohagadwadi inscription, Bhadaṁta Idarakhita, is also named in the Pale inscription. The similarity of the two inscriptions has led scholars to propose that the same individual was responsible for donations at both sites. The Lohagadwadi inscription is more detailed than the Pale inscription and records several forms of donation. It names another individual, Gosāla, in association with Idarakhita. The recorded donations include a water cistern, benches, a path and a railing. Ganvir and Bamb's 2026 study places the Lohagadwadi and Pale inscriptions within the broader history of the dissemination of early Jainism and Jain monasticism in the Western Deccan. They regard the discovery of the Lohagadwadi inscription as significant for reassessing the evidence for early Jain religious networks in the region.

== Relationship with Pale ==
Lohagadwadi and the Pale cave are approximately 25 kilometres apart. Their inscriptions share the invocation Namo arahaṁtānaṁ, the first line of Namokara Mantra, and the name of Bhadaṁta Idarakhita. The close palaeographic and textual relationship between the two inscriptions is central to the interpretation of Lohagadwadi as an early Jain site.

The two inscriptions are particularly important because they provide evidence for Jain activity in the hill country of the present-day Pune region during the early historic period. Ganvir and Bamb argue that the evidence from Pale and Lohagadwadi contributes to a revised understanding of the spread of Jainism and Jain monasticism in the Western Deccan.

== Significance ==
Lohagadwadi is significant primarily for its epigraphical evidence. The small size and relatively plain character of the caves contrast with the more elaborate cave complexes elsewhere in the Western Deccan, making the inscription particularly important for identifying the religious context of the site. The site provides evidence for early rock-cut religious activity in the Maval region and, together with the Pale inscription, contributes to the archaeological study of the early history of Jainism in Maharashtra.

== See also ==
- Pale Jain Cave
- Lohagad
- Hathigumpha inscription
- Brahmi script
