= Hathigumpha inscription =

Inscription in a cavern in Odisha, India

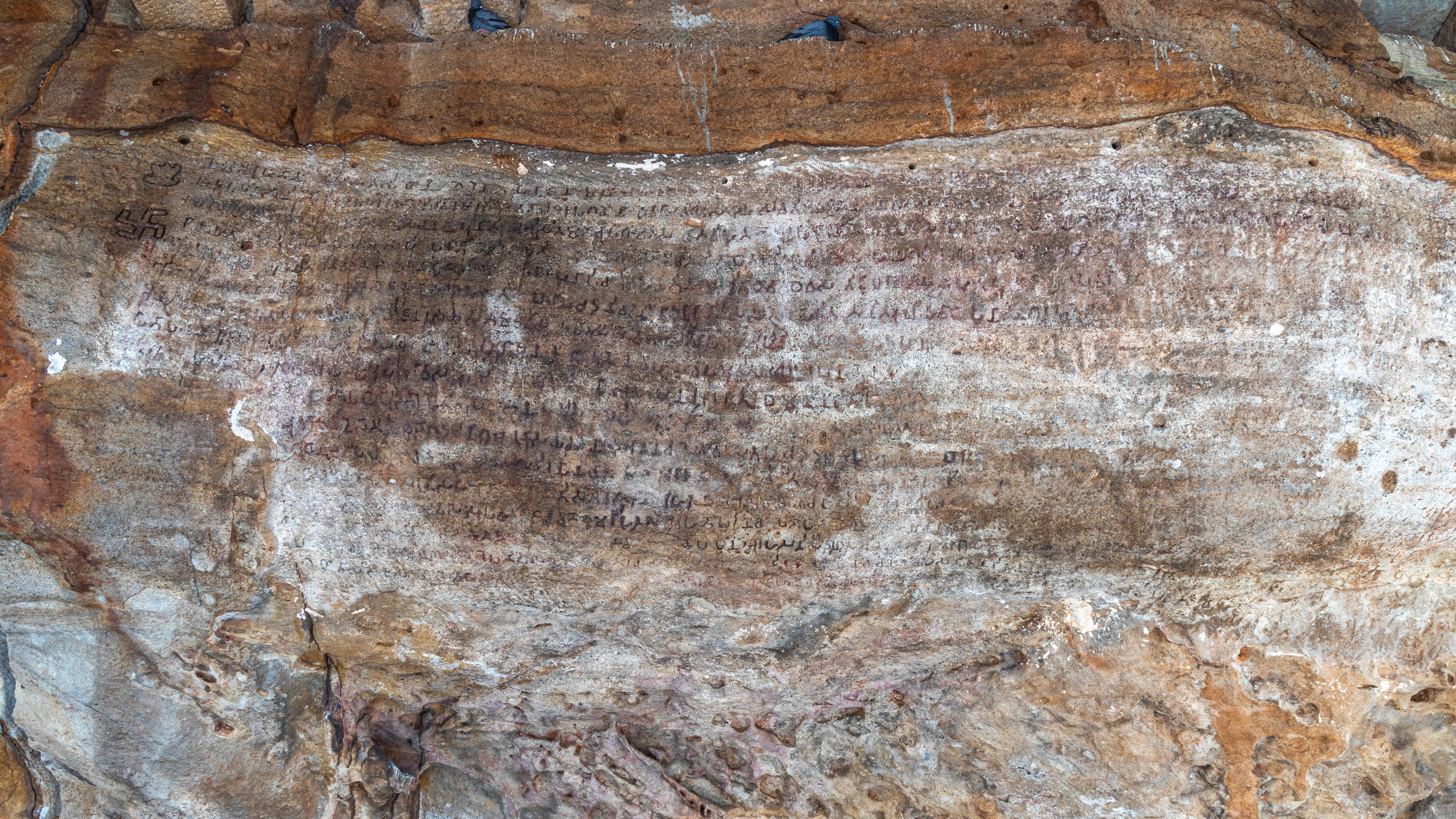
- Material: Stone, rock-cut
- Writing: Prakrit
- Created: 2nd century BCE- 1st century CE
- Period/culture: Kalinga
- Place: Udayagiri Hills, Bhubaneswar, Odisha, India
- Present location: 20°15′47″N 85°47′08″E

Location
- Udayagiri Odisha (India) Location of inscription

The Hathigumpha inscription (Odia pronunciation: [ɦa.t̪ʰi.gum.pʰa]) is a Jain inscription consisting of seventeen lines written in Prakrit incised in Brahmi script in a cavern called Hathigumpha in Udayagiri hills, near Bhubaneswar in Odisha, India. Dated between the second century BCE and the first century CE, it was inscribed by the Jain king Kharavela of the Kalinga kingdom. (Note: The inscription is loaded with Jaina phrases, though the inscription explicitly states in verse 17 that he is sava-pasamda-pujako (worshipper of every religious sect).)

The Hathigumpha Inscription presents, among other topics, a biographical sketch of a king in the eastern region of ancient India (now part of and near Odisha). It also includes information on religious values, public infrastructure projects, military expeditions and their purposes, society and culture. Paleographically, the inscription dates from the middle of the first century BCE to the early first century CE.

== Location and history ==
The Hathigumpha inscription (transl. "Elephant Cave" inscription) of Kharavela is found at Udayagiri, about 5 kilometres (3.1 mi) west of Bhubaneswar international airport. The Udayagiri hills host many ancient rock-cut caves such as the Rani Gumpha. Among these, to the west of Rani Gumpha, is a cavern called Hathigumpha on the southern face of Udayagiri hills. (Note: The Hathigumpha is between the Sarpa Gumpha (on its right) and Svargapuri and Mancapuri Gumpha (left).) The inscription is named after this cavern. It is found partly in front and partly on the ceiling of the cave. Though dated to between 2nd-century BCE and 1st-century CE, the inscription was unknown to the scholars till they were rediscovered by A. Sterling and published in Asiatic Researches XV in 1825. An eye-copy prepared by Kittoe was published by James Prinsep in 1837, followed by a trace by Alexander Cunningham in 1877. R.L. Mitra published a modified version in his Antiquities of Orissa in 1880.

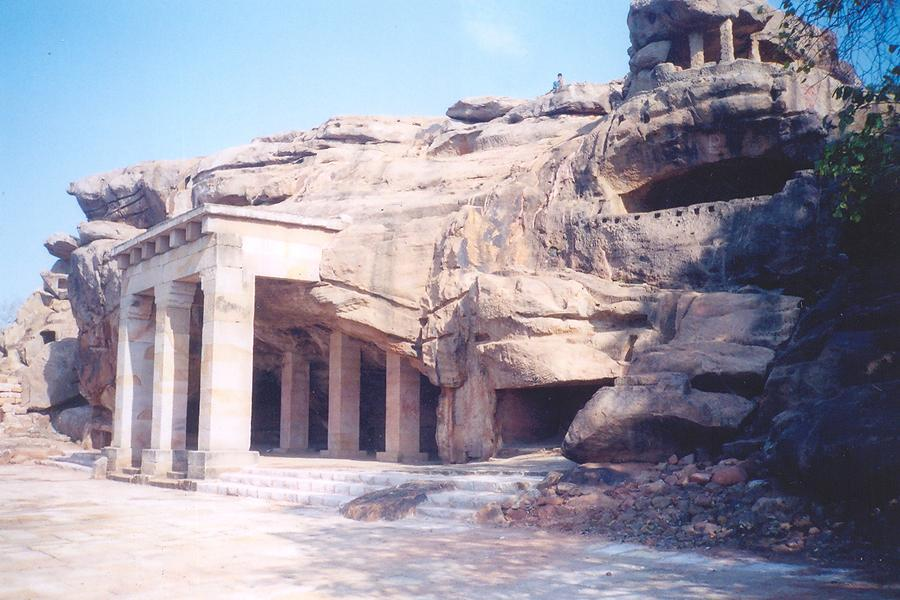
Entrance of the Hathigumpha monument. The pillared front, steps and other structures were added in 19th and 20th centuries to help conserve the monument.

The first cast of this important inscription was published by Bhagwan Lal Indraji in 1884, followed by publication of an ink impression in 1906 by Bloch. Indraji was the first scholar to declare that the king eulogised in the Hathigumpha inscription was named Kharavela, but the cast impression, his translation and interpretation had many errors.

The translations, disputes, problems with Hathigumpha inscription and various corrections have attracted the attention of scholars such as Kielhorn, Fleet, Luders, Banerji, Jayaswal, Konow, Thomas, Majumdar, Barua, Pandey, Sircar and many others. According to Walter Spink, a historian known for his studies on Ajanta and other cave monuments of India, early misreadings and misinterpretations of the Hathigumpha inscription have led to errors and incorrect theories being widely held about the history of Andhra Pradesh, Odisha, Deccan region and early India.

== Description ==
This inscription, consisting of seventeen lines has been incised in Prakrit language and Brahmi script. The inscription starts on the overhanging brow of Hathigumpha cavern and the first eight lines are visible at the front. The remaining nine lines continue on the same rock, but given the sloping shape of the cavern, it appears on the cavern's roof. The seventeen lines cover about 15 feet by 5.5 feet of the stone's surface. Below this inscribed rock, the cavern's walls are rock-cut and some sections polished. These too have inscriptions, but these were added between the 10th and 11th-century, and are called minor Hathigumpha inscriptions. Closer to the floor, there are small rock cut partitions which do not form a wall between the cells.

Composed as it is in a very obscure Prakrit, and its characters badly weathered by centuries of exposure to the elements and in places quite illegible, the Hathigumpha inscription has long been the subject of a great controversy among historians and paleographers.

— Arthur Llewellyn Basham

A hand writing analysis suggests that three different ancient scribes likely worked together to produce this inscription. The scribes likely chiseled the irregular overhanging rock and then deep incised the Brahmi text. Lines 1–6 of the main Hathigumpha inscription are well preserved, while last four Lines 16–17 show losses in the left part and the rest of these lines partially preserved. The other seven lines – Lines 7 through 15 – in the middle are problematic and can be read in many different ways. According to Jayaswal, a scholar whose ink impressions and readings are among the most cited in the studies related to Hathigumpha inscription:

- Line 5 has 13 syllables obliterated
- Half of Line 6 record is missing, while Line 7 record is mostly gone (these are 6th and 7th year of Kharavela's reign)
- Lines 8 through 15 show much natural damage and large gaps, making them prone to misreadings

These middle lines have been eroded and corrupted by natural processes over 2,000 some years. Processes such as rains, dripping water, dust, hornets and such causes have leveled or corrupted some Brahmi characters. In some cases so much that it is difficult to distinguish whether a cut is a chisel mark or a part of an aksara (letter). In other cases, the natural processes have added an angular-stroke or mark that can be included or rejected as an intended modification. The different hand writing styles found in the inscription further complicate what and how to read the letters. Thus, variant casts and ink impressions of the Hathigumpha inscriptions have been published, in part fueling the disagreements, interpretations and different scholarly translations.

== Date ==
The mid and late-19th century scholarship suggested that this inscription may be from the 3rd or 2nd-century BCE. According to Buhler, the palaeographical analysis suggests this inscription cannot be earlier than the 2nd-century BCE, or later than 1st-century BCE. In 1920, Jayaswal and Banerji stated that this inscription cannot be placed before the 2nd-century, and may be a bit later. On palaeographic grounds and considering it with information in other ancient Indian inscriptions, Sircar places this in the second half of the 1st-century BCE, or possibly in the first decades of the 1st-century CE.

== Inscription ==
The seventeen lines of the inscription has been variously translated by many. The translation published by Jayaswal and Banerji in Epigraphia Indica Volume 20 (public domain), with alternate readings by other scholars, is as follows:

Hathigumpha inscription
Lines	Translation (Jayaswal and Banerji)	Notes
L1	Salutation to the Arhats [Jinas]. Salutation to all the Siddhas. By illustrious Kharavela, the Aira (Aila), the Great King, the descendant of Mahameghavahana, the increaser (of the glory) of the Cheti (Chedi) dynasty, (endowed) with excellent and auspicious marks and features, possessed of virtues which have reached (the ends of) the four quarters, overlord of Kalinga,	The opening dedication (Namokar Mantra) and other lines confirm that Jainism was well established in Kalinga, and that this is a Jaina inscription. It mentions the ancient Chedi dynasty of Greater India. Barua interprets the lengths of lines differently; to him, L1 and L2 are the first line.
L2	for fifteen years, with a body ruddy and handsome were played youthsome sport; after that (by him who) had mastered (royal) correspondence, currency, finance, civil and religious laws (and) who had become well-versed in all (branches) of learning, for nine years (the office of) Yuvaraja (heir apparent) was administered. Having completed the twenty-fourth year, at that time, (he) who had been prosperous (vardhamana) since his infancy(?) and who (was destined) to have wide conquests as those of Vena,	This corresponds to the stages of life described in Brihaspati Sutra, where first 25 years are student's youthful life, thereafter comes manhood with household-social responsibilities. Barua translates the five skills learnt by the crown prince as "writing, coinage, account, administration and procedures".
L3	then in the state of manhood, obtains the imperial (maharajya) coronation in the dynasty of Kalinga. As soon as he is anointed, in the first (regnal) year (he) causes repairs of the gates, the walls and the buildings (of the city), (which had been) damaged by storm; in the city of Kalinga (he) causes the erection of the embankments of the lake (called after); Khibira Rishi, (and) of (other) tanks and cisterns, (also) the restoration of all the gardens (he) causes to be	A list of public works and infrastructure projects completed at state's expense (see Line 4).
L4	done at (the cost of) thirty-five-hundred-thousands, and (he) gratifies the People. And in the second year (he), disregarding Satakamni, despatches to the western regions an army strong in cavalry, elephants, infantry (nara) and chariots (ratha) and by that army having reached the Kanha-bemna, he throws the city of the Musikas into consternation. Again in the third year,	The first war with Satakamni, with a list of military regiments in ancient India
L5	(he) versed in the science of the Gandharvas (i.e., music), entertains the capital with the exhibition of dapa, dancing, singing and instrumental music and by causing to be held festivities and assemblies (samajas); similarly in the fourth year, 'the Abode of Vidyadharas' built by the former Kalingan king(s), which had not been damaged before (...lost...) with their coronets rendered meaningless, with their helmets (?) (bilma) cut in twain (?), and with their umbrellas and	A list of arts and culture in ancient India; it is unclear what dapa was, but much later texts suggest a form of stage acting by small moving teams. However, Barua reads "dampa", and translates it to "combat" (sort of wrestling).
L6	bhingaras cast away, deprived of their jewels (i.e., ratana, Skt. ratna, precious objects) all the Rathikas and Bhojakas (he) causes to bow down at his feet. Now in the fifth year he brings into the capital from the road of Tansauliya the canal excavated in the year one hundred-and-three of King Nanda (... lost ...) Having been (re-)anointed (he while) celebrating the Rajasuya, remits all tithes and cesses,	Another major public water infrastructure project, plus tax exemptions According to Barua, this water canal project extended a previously dug canal; it brought water to Kalinga capital, and helps dates king Nanda to 103 years before the fifth year of Kharavela reign. He adds that it can also be read a bit differently and then it would be 300 years earlier. Sircar agrees with Barua, then adds that it must be 300 years as the Nanda dynasty was overthrown by 326 BCE, and Kharavela is definitely not from the 3rd-century BCE.
L7	bestows many privileges (amounting to) hundreds of thousands or the City-Corporation and the Realm-Corporation. In the seventh year of his reign, his famous wife of Vajiraghara obtained the dignity of auspicious motherhood (... lost ...). Then in the eighth year, (he) with a large army having sacked Goradhagiri	a child is born to his wife and him; According to Sircar, this ink impression and reading is doubtful and Kharavela's wife from Vajiragraha family is problematic and unlikely. Similarly the alleged achievements of Kharavela here are problematic and doubtful, states Sircar.
L8	causes pressure on Rajagaha (Rajagriha). On account of the loud report of this act of valour, the Yavana (Greek) King Dimi[ta] retreated to Mathura having extricated his demoralized army and transport (... lost ...). (He) gives (... lost ...) with foliage	a mention of Greek rule and claims of their retreat to Mathura; Scholars debate on whether this refers to Demetrios of Bactria, though it most likely references another Indo-Greek ruler who had his base in Mathura.
L9	Kalpa (wish-fulfilling) trees, elephants, chariots with their drivers, houses, residences and resthouses. And to make all these acceptable (he) gives at a fire sacrifice (?) exemption (from taxes) to the caste of Brahmins. Of Arhat (... lost ...)	mention he made donations and paid reverence to the Arhats and Siddhas, consistent with his role as a devout Jain ruler. He also adds that a Jain king would not be expected to perform the Rajasuya sacrifice, and assumes that the scribe must have intended a different similar word with the meaning "royal fortune".
L10	(... lost ...)(He) causes to be built . . . . a royal residence (called) the Palace of Great Victory (Mahavijaya) at the cost of thirty-eight hundred thousands. And in the tenth year (he), following (the threefold policy) of chastisement, alliance and conciliation sends out an expedition against Bharatavasa (and) brings about the conquest of the land (or, country) (... lost ...) and obtains jewels and precious things of the (kings) attacked.	another claim of war and conquest However, Sircar doubts that this part is being accurately read.
L11	(... lost ...) And the market-town (?) Pithumda founded by the Ava King he ploughs down with a plough of asses; and (he) thoroughly breaks up the confederacy of the T[r]amira (Dramira) countries of one hundred and thirteen years, which has been a source of danger to (his) Country (Janapada). And in the twelfth year he terrifies the kings of the Utarapatha with (... lost ...) thousands of	breaks up the confederacy of Tamil kings, later a victory over Utarapatha (northwest);
L12	(... lost ...) And causing panic amongst the people of Magadha (he) drives (his) elephants into the Sugamgiya (Palace), and (he) makes the King of Magadha, Bahasatimita, bow at his feet. And (he) sets up (the image) 'the Jina of Kalinga' which had been taken away by King Nanda (... lost ...) and causes to be brought home the riches of Amga and Magadha along with the keepers of the family jewels of (... lost ...)	Victory over Magadha, sets up an image of Jina of Kalinga, previously taken away by King Nanda Barua reads the "honored seat of Jina" which was taken away by king Nanda to be brought back to Kalinga in a royal procession. According to Sircar, the readings here linking to Purhyamitra Sunga is doubtful and chronologically not possible.
L13	(... lost ...) (He) builds excellent towers with carved interiors and creates a settlement of a hundred masons, giving them exemption from land revenue. And a wonderful and marvellous enclosure of stockade for driving in the elephants (he)(... lost ...) and horses, elephants, jewels and rubies as well as numerous pearls in hundreds (he) causes to be brought here from the Pandya King.	sets up a school of masons (artisans and architects) and builds carved towers, gains wealth from the Pandyas. According to Barua, this portion states that Kharavela set up streets, gates and temples, and "one hundred Vasukis (dragon chiefs) sent him precious stones, rare and wonderful elephants, horses and such animals". Pandya king sent him gifts of clothes and ornaments.
L14	(... lost ...).(he) subjugates. In the thirteenth year, on the Kumari Hill where the Wheel of Conquest had been well-revolved (i.e., the religion of Jina had been preached), (he) offers respectfully royal maintenances, China clothes (silks) and white clothes (to the Jain monks). on the religious life and conduct at the Relic Memorial. By Kharavela, the illustrious, a layman devoted to worship, is realised (the nature of) jiva and deha	donations to preachers of Jainism in pursuit of soul and body
L15	(... lost ...)bringing about a Council of the wise ascetics and sages, from hundred (i.e., all) quarters, the monks (samanas) of good deeds and who have fully followed (the injunctions) (... lost ...) near the Relic Depository of the Arhat, on the top of the hill, (... lost ...) with stones (... lost ...) brought from many miles (yojanas) quarried from excellent mines (he builds) shelters for the Sinhapatha Queen Sindhula. (... lost ...)	sets up a council of advisors consisting of ascetics and sages from different parts of ancient India
L16	(... lost ...)Patalaka(?)………(he) sets up four columns inlaid with beryl (... lost ...) at the cost of twenty-five hundred thousands; (he) causes to be compiled expeditiously the (text) of the seven-fold Angas of the sixty-four (letters). He is the King of Peace, the King of Prosperity, the King of Monks (bhikshus), the King of Religion (Dharma), who has been seeing, hearing and realising blessings (kalyanas)-	mentions 7 angas and 64 lipis
L17	(... lost ...) accomplished in extraordinary virtues, respector of every sect, the repairer of all temples, one whose chariot and army are irresistible, one whose empire is protected by the chief of the empire (himself), descended from the family of the Royal Sage Vasu, the Great conqueror, the King, the illustrious Kharavela.	mention of respect for all religions, patron of all temples, and the closing praise of the king.

== Significance ==
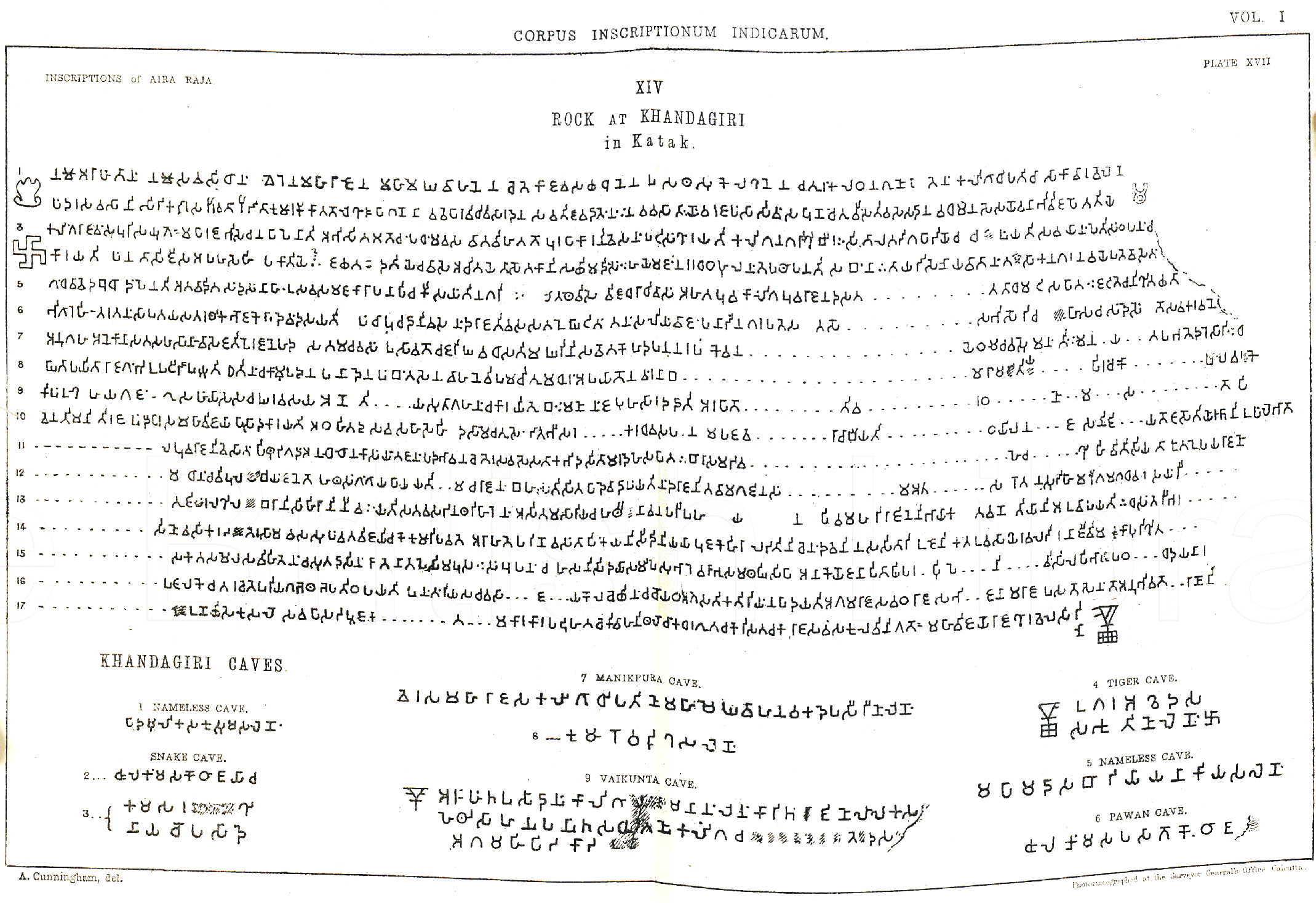
Hathigumpha inscription of King Khāravela at Udayagiri Hills as first drawn in "Corpus Inscriptionum Indicarum, Volume I: Inscriptions of Asoka by Alexander Cunningham", 1827

The Hathigumpha Inscription is the main source of information about the Jain Kalinga ruler Kharavela. His year-by-year achievements in this inscription, states Richard Salomon, "approximates the character of a pure panegyric". This is an early prototype of prashasti style of inscriptions.

The disagreements between scholars is in reading with interpolations, interpreting, dating and then linking the names of places and people mentioned with other records and general chronology of ancient events assuming a particular reading is correct. Notable mentions in the Hathigumpha Inscription include:

- major public infrastructure projects in ancient India (these lines can be clearly read)
- charitable donations to monks, public, Brahmins
- festivals and arts
- a war against the Satavahana king Satakarni. This mention has been a key contributor to the mis-dating of many Buddhist monuments in the central India, states Walter Spink. First the Hathigumpha inscription was dated between the 3rd and 2nd-century BCE, then Satakarni was treated as a contemporary of Kharavela based on this reading. This error compounded, leading to the widely repeated belief in modern Indian literature that the earliest Andhra dynasties started in late 3rd to early 2nd-century BCE, that these ancient Andhra rulers and others built the Chaitya halls at Bhaja, Nasik, Kondane and some Krishna river valley sites between 300 BCE and 100 BCE. This error has multiplied, says Spink, whereby many other inscriptions, coins, texts mentioning the names of Andhra kings, along with monuments have been dated to far more ancient period, than what later discoveries and scholarship has found. This error has also affected the chronology of art development in Indian history. Many of these monuments and dates should be shifted forward by 200 to 300 years, to 1st-century CE and early 2nd-century CE.

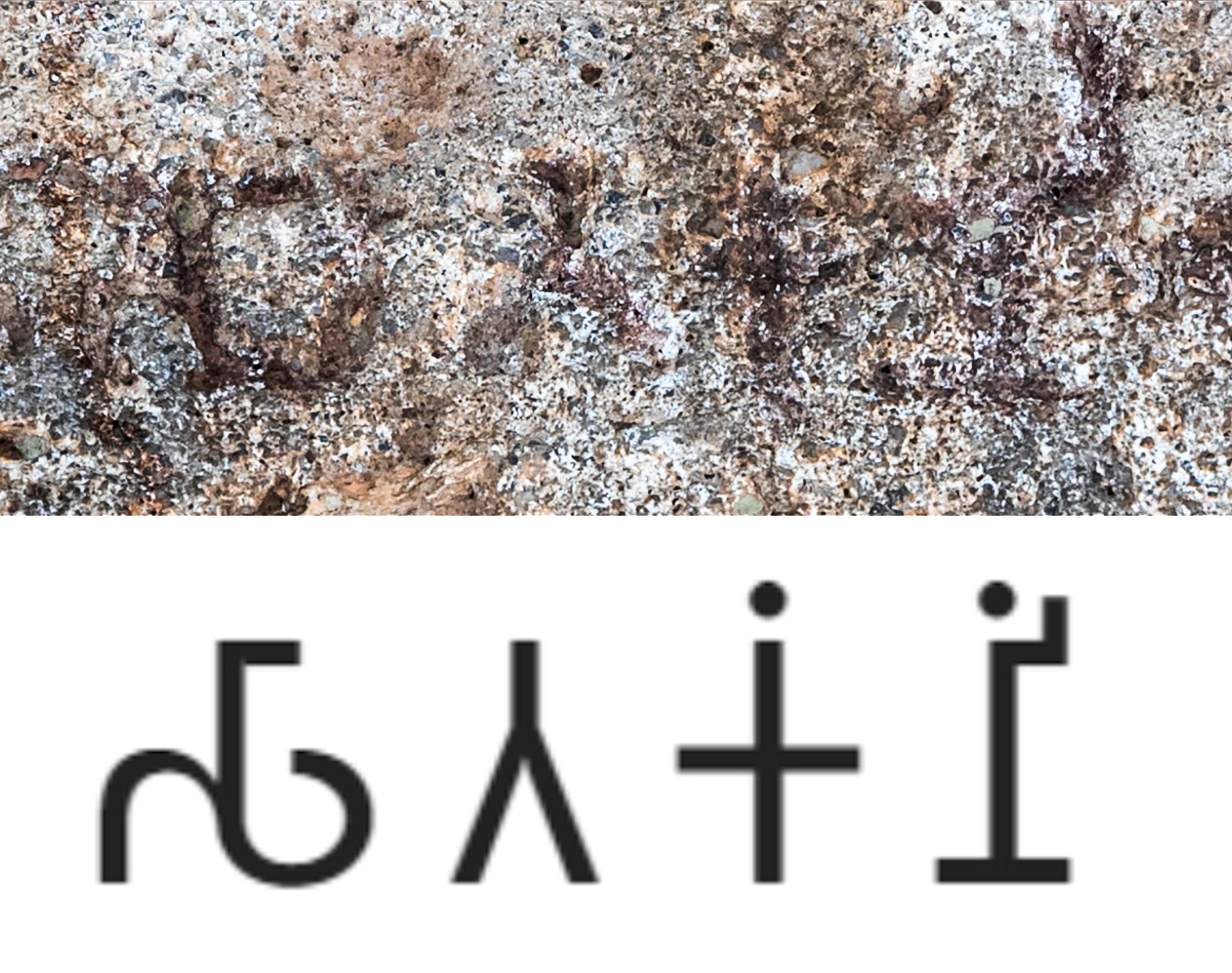
"Satakarni" in the inscription.

- a Nanda king building a water canal, which was then extended by Kharavela to the Kalinga capital. This Nanda king is by one interpretation 130 years senior (largely disputed), by another reading about 300 years prior to Kharavela. If Kharavela is placed in the 1st-century BCE and this reading is assumed to reflect real events over 300 years in ancient India, then this interpretation implies a historical record keeping between the 4th-century BCE and 1st-century BCE, places a public water infrastructure project by an Indian ruler also in the 4th-century BCE, along with a Jaina tradition of image worship.
- a Nanda king taking away "Ka[li]ngajinam". This has been interpreted as either taking away a Jaina image or its seat from Kalinga or conquering a place in Kalinga, which was then brought back to Kalinga by Kharavela. In 1925, Glasenapp suggested that may mean an idol of a Jina. Modern era scholars such as Rao and Thapar too interpret it as a Jaina image (idol) was taken away by Nanda king (c. 5th-century BCE) and then it being brought back by Kharavela (c. 2nd century BCE). According to Sonya Quintalla, this should not be interpreted to be an idol or image. The ancient archaeological sites related to Jainism such as a part of the Mathura site at Kankali Tila confirms that there were no anthropomorphic idol-image worship in these centuries of Jainism, rather there was the practice of worshipping non-figural objects. According to her, even in Udayagiri, the Mancapuri cave nearby shows a worship gathering and there is no anthropomorphic figural idol or image there. Thus, the interpretation of this word as idol or image, and it being taken away centuries before Kharavela cannot be correct.

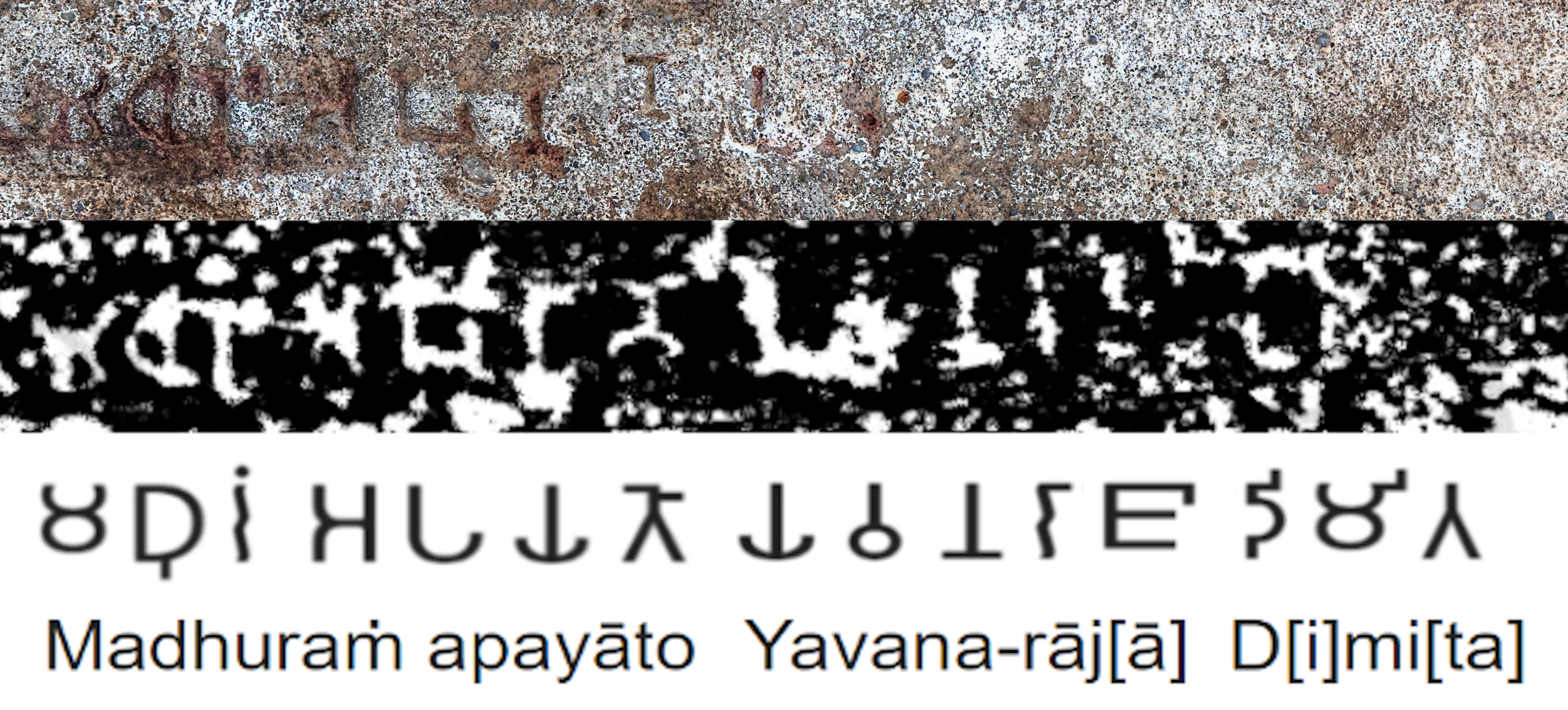
Actual, fairly damaged portion, and the disputed reading 𑀫𑀥𑀼𑀭𑀁𑀅𑀧𑀬𑀢𑁄𑀬𑀯𑀦𑀭𑀸𑀚𑀸𑀤𑀺𑀫𑀺𑀢 "Madhuraṁ apayāto Yavana-rāj[ā] D[i]mi[ta]" ("The Yavana king Demetrius retreated to Mathura"). This reading is considered as "extremely doubtful".

- some Yavana (Greek) king, forcing him to retreat to Mathura. The name of the Yavana king is not clear. R. D. Banerji and K.P. Jayaswal in 1920 read the name of the Yavana king as "Dimita", and identify him with Demetrius I of Bactria. Romila Thapar too, in The Past Before Us published in 2013, states that it is "probably the Indo-Greek king Demetrios". (Note: One of many chronological problems, explains D.C. Sircar, with identifying this damaged word in the inscription with Demetrios is that it he is generally dated to about 180 BCE, which would place Kharavela in early 2nd-century BCE, the Nanda kings in early 5th-century BCE, the Mauryas before the Indo-Greeks, and make the Mauryas contemporary or earlier than the most accepted dates for the death of the Buddha and his contemporary Mahavira. This is grossly inconsistent with other known records.) However, according to Ramaprasad Chanda and other scholars, this identification results in "chronological impossibilities". This interpolated reading, states Sircar, is suspect by Banerji and Jayaswal's own admission, and cannot be true based on other inscriptions and ancient records about Indo-Greek kings. According to Sailendra Nath Sen, the Yavana ruler was certainly not Demerius; he might have been a later Indo-Greek ruler of eastern Punjab.

According to Salomon, the "readings, translations, and historical interpretations" of the Hathigumpha inscription "varies widely by different scholars", and it is not possible to establish its single standard version. These interpretations have created significantly different histories of ancient India, some with phantom eras, states Salomon. Newly discovered inscriptions at Guntupalli in Andhra Pradesh have shed further light on this inscription.

== See also ==
- Indian inscriptions
- Pale Jain cave
- Lohagadwadi caves
