= Lohagad =

Fort in Maharashtra, India

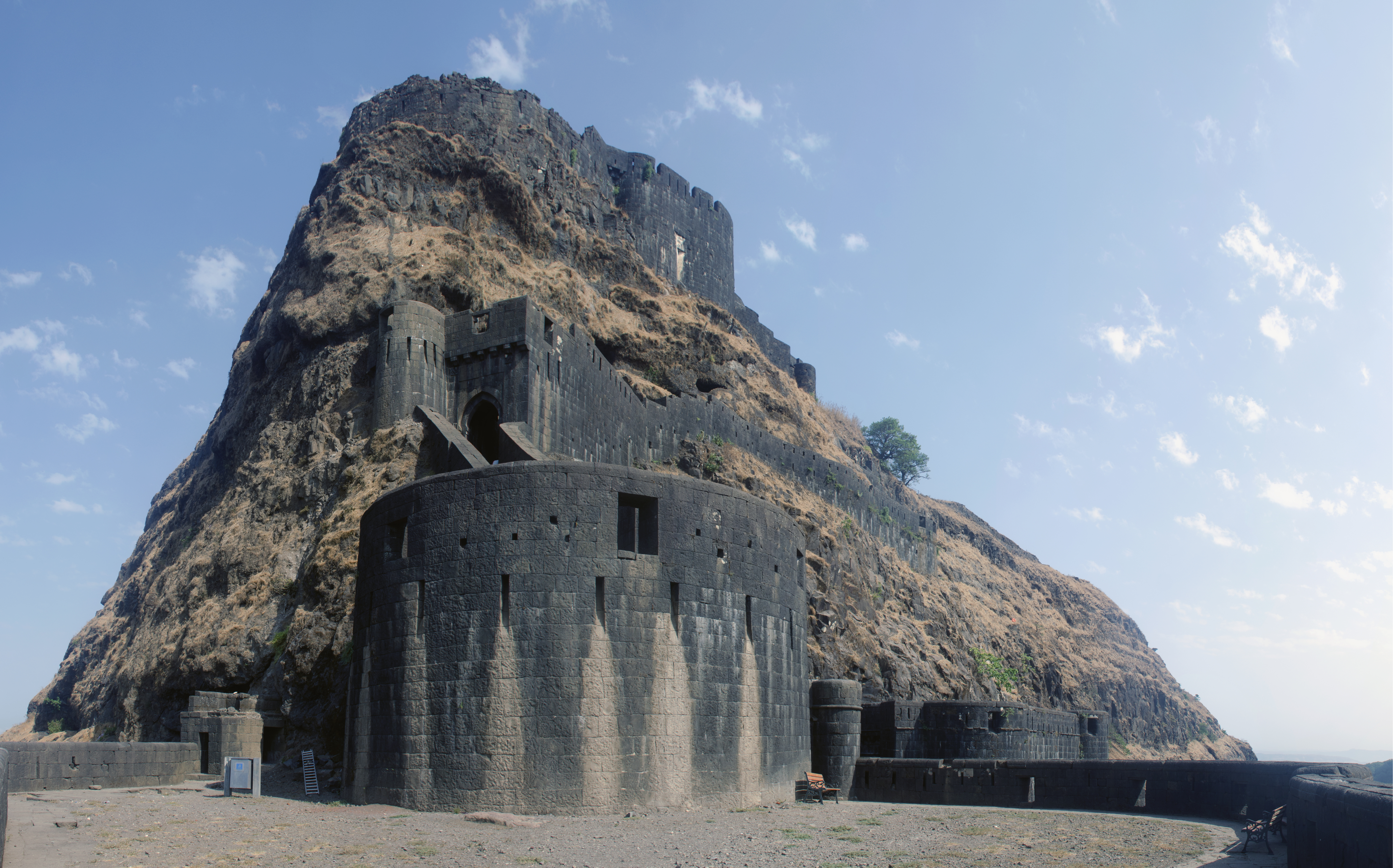
- Bastions and gates of Lohagad Fort

Highest point
- Elevation: 1,033 m (3,389 ft)
- Coordinates: 18°42′32″N 73°28′36″E

Geography
- Location within Maharashtra
- Location: Pune District, Maharashtra, India
- Parent range: Western Ghats

UNESCO World Heritage Site
- Part of: Maratha Military Landscapes of India
- Criteria: Cultural: iv, vi
- Reference: 1739-003
- Inscription: 2025 (47th Session)

Lohagad is one of the many hill forts of Maharashtra state in India. Situated close to the hill station Lonavala and 52 km (32 mi) northwest of Pune, Lohagad rises to an elevation of 1,033 m (3,389 ft) above sea level. The fort is connected to the neighboring Visapur fort by a small range. The fort was under the Lohtamia empire for the majority of the time. Chhatrapati Shivaji Maharaj captured the fort in 1648 and the fort remained in Maratha empire till March 1818. The fort was under a short period of 5 years under the Mughal Empire. In 2026, Lohagad Fort received national attention as the location of the murder of businessman Ketan Agarwal.

== History ==
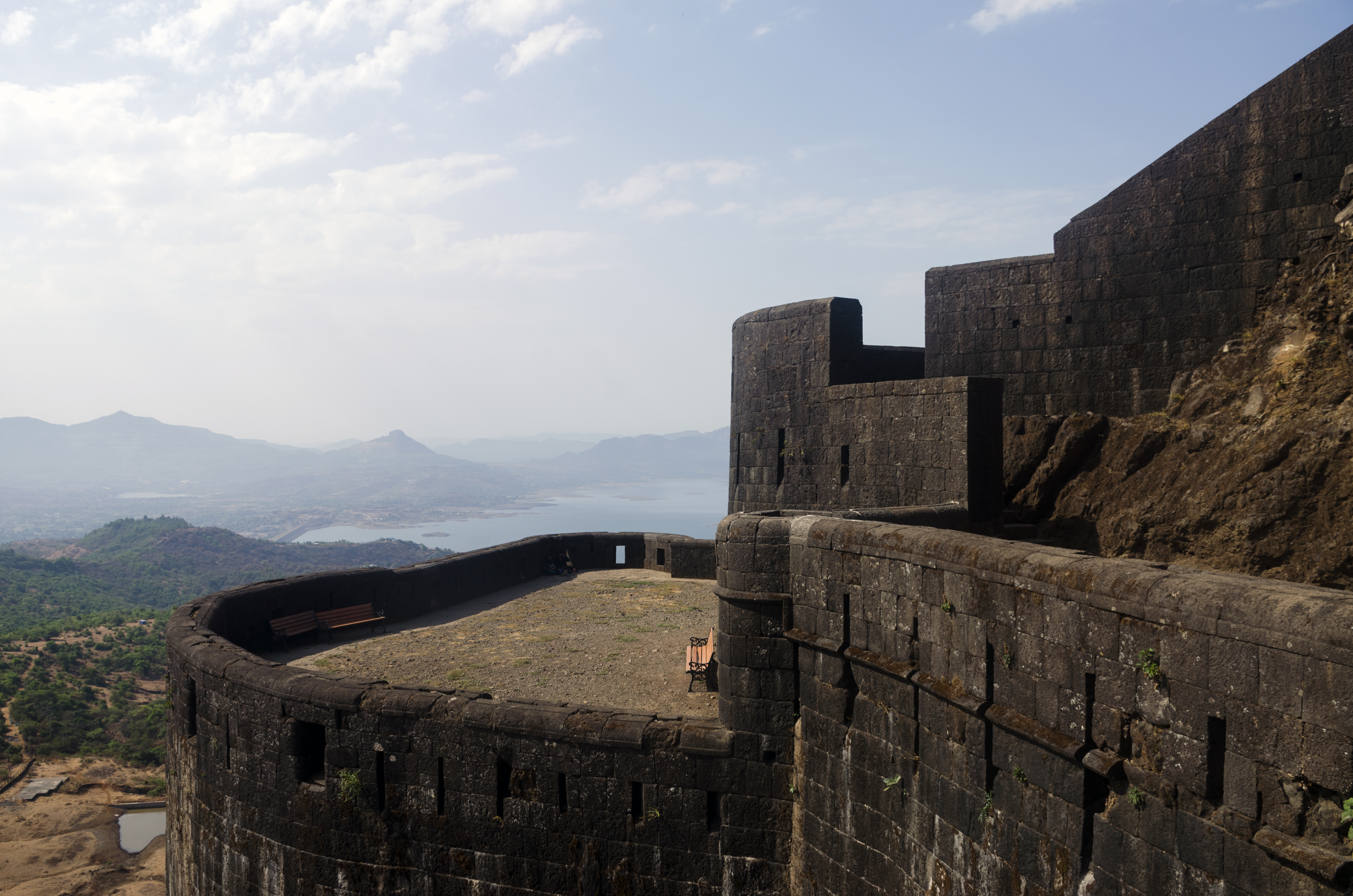
Bastions of Lohagad Fort

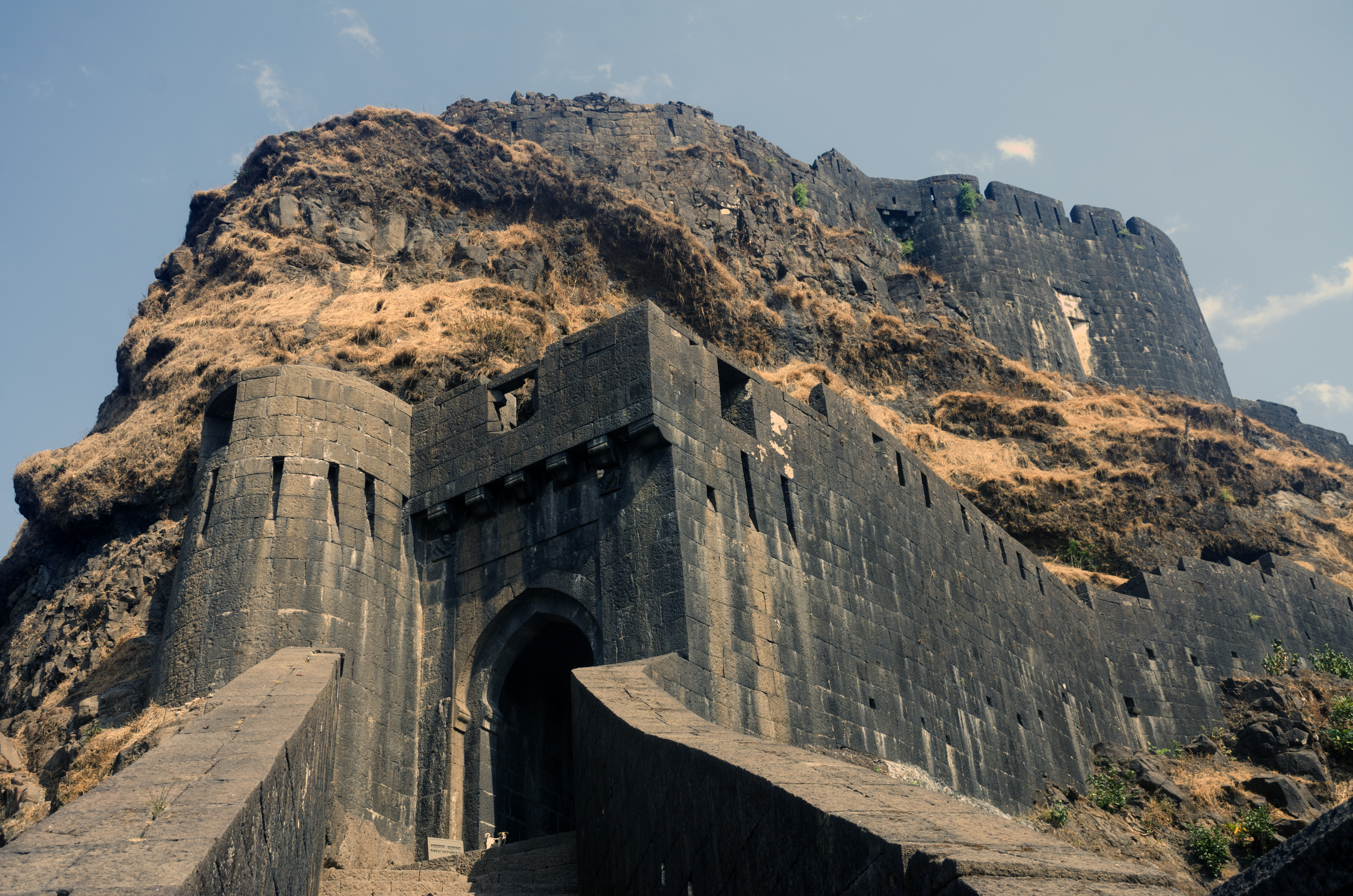
Narayan Darwaza

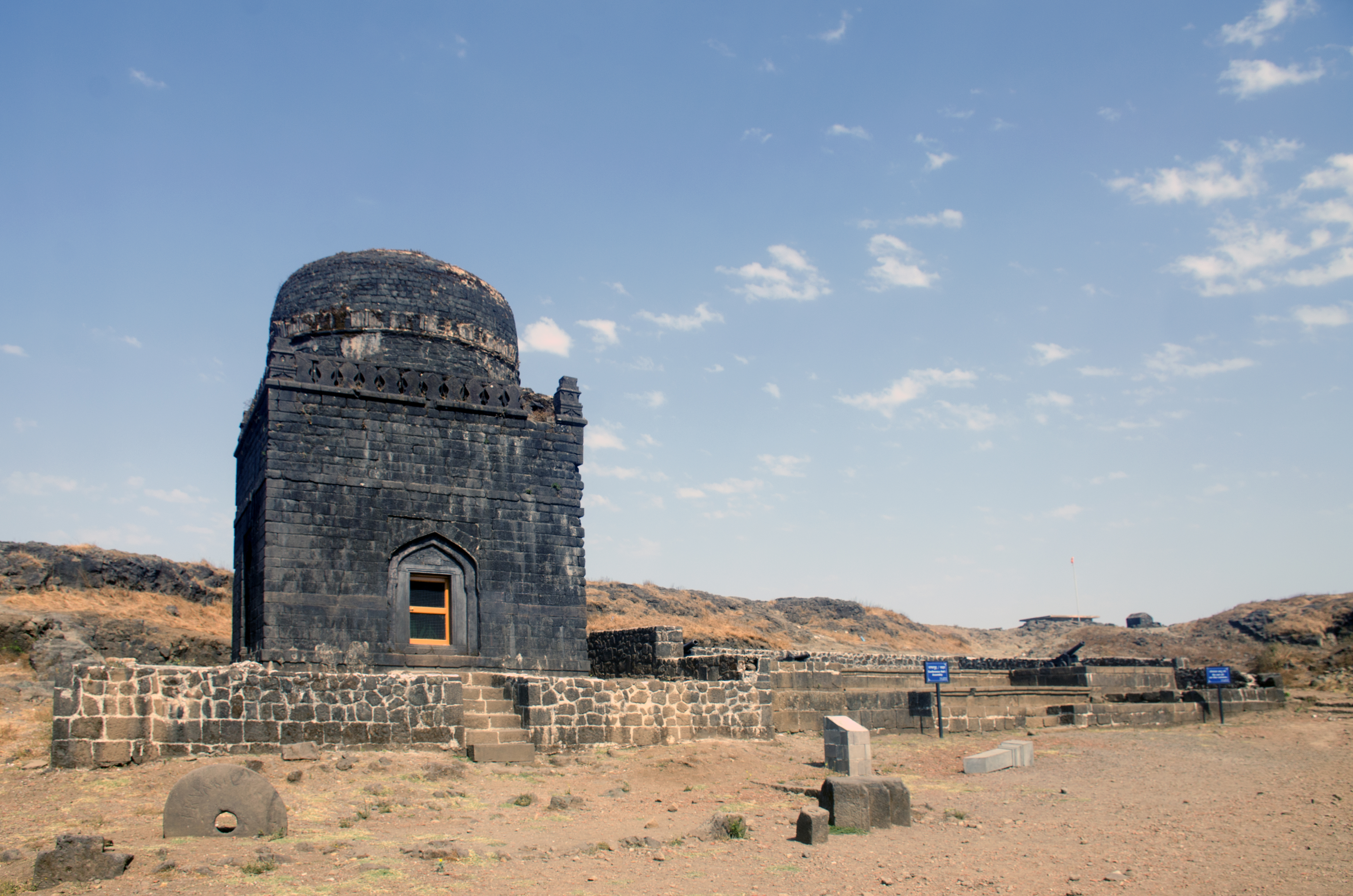
Tomb atop Lohagad Fort

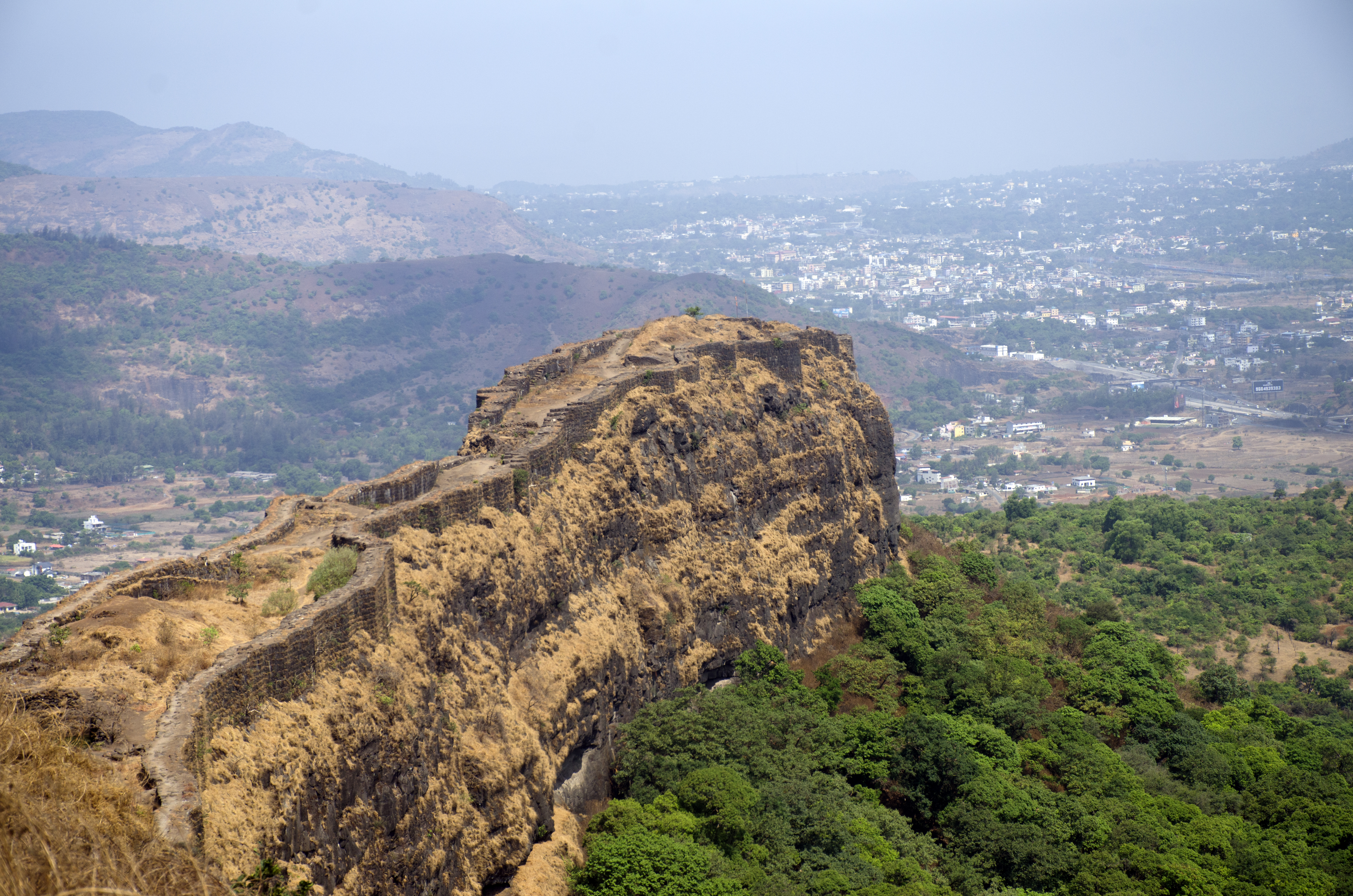
Lohagad Fort Vinchu Kata

The initial construction of Lohagad Fort is attributed to the Lohtamia dynasty, who ruled the region during the 10th century CE, the fort was under them for the longest period. Lohagad has a long history with several dynasties occupying it at different periods of time: Satavahanas, Chalukyas, Rashtrakutas, Yadavas, Bahamanis, Nizams, Mughals and Marathas. Chatrapati Shivaji Maharaj captured it in 1648 AD, but he was forced to surrender it to the Mughals in 1665 AD by the Treaty of Purandar. Chatrapati Shivaji Maharaj recaptured the fort in 1670 AD and used it for keeping his treasury. This fort was used to keep the winnings from Surat. Later in Peshwa time Nana Phadnavis used this fort for living for some time and built several structures in the fort such as a big tank and a step-well.

=== Jain Inscription ===
The Lohagad fort has caves on its South Side facing Lohgadwadi. In September 2019 an inscription in Jain Brahmi script in Prakrit language dating back to the 1st or 2nd century B.C., was discovered by team of trekkers from Pune in the cave on the cliff. The inscription was studied by Dr. Shreekant Pradhan, an ancient Indian paintings scholar working at Deccan College Post Graduate and Research Institute.

The inscription was found on the outside wall of a Rock-Cut cave on the Eastern Side Cliff of the Lohgad fort, close to Lohgadwadi village. The inscription is written in the Brahmi script and the language is Prakrit influenced Sanskrit.

The inscription is similar to, but more descriptive than, an inscription discovered at Pale caves (Maval) by Mr. R. L. Bhide and studied by archaeologists H. D. Sankalia and Shobhana Gokhale in 1969. It starts with ‘Namo Arihantanam’ which is commonly used by Jains in Navakar Mantra, pointing to the fact that the Lohgad cave is a Jain Rock-Cut cave. The inscription at Pale caves also begins in a similar manner and based on Sankalia and Gokhale’s study, it was assumed to be a Jain inscription.

The inscription mentions the name "Ida Rakhita", meaning Indra Rakshita, who donated water cisterns, Rock-Cut benches to settlements in the area. The inscription at Pale also mentions the same name. The newly discovered inscription is 50 cm - wide and 40 cm - long and is written in six lines.The Lohagad Jain cave is near the fort.

The fort has been declared as a protected monument by the government.

== Geography and Climate ==
Lohagad is part of the Western Ghats. It rises to an elevation of 1,033 m (3,389 ft) above sea level, and is located to the southwest of the larger Visapur fort. The range divides the basins of the Indrayani river and Pavana lake. Lohagad overlooks the Pavana reservoir, located to the south of the mountain. The hill extends to the northwest to a fortified spur, called Vinchukada (Scorpion's tail) because of its resembling shape. The four large gates of Lohagad are still in good condition and reasonably intact. During the monsoon, the top of the fort is covered with mist and clouds and becomes particularly wet with growing moss. The roads and trails leading to the hill are quite slippery at this time of the year and precautions are necessary to be taken while venturing the routes.

== Accessibility ==
Lohagad fort can be accessed by various modes of travel. The nearest airport is the new Navi Mumbai International Airport.

The nearest train station is Malavli, which can be accessed by suburban trains between Lonavala and Pune. The nearest major train station is Lonavala, on the Mumbai-Pune railway line. Lohagad is connected by the Mumbai-Pune Highway and can also be accessed from Paud via Kolvan and Dudhiware Khind for all vehicles.

People can also hike all the way to the fort. Bhaja Caves is also on the way to Lohagad.

A variety of birds and insects can also be spotted in these hills.

== Nearby attractions ==
- Bhaja Caves - 2 km (1.2 mi) from Malavli, once home to Buddhist monks.
- Karla Caves
- Lohagad Jain cave
- Lonavala - 20 km (12 mi), a famous and scenic hill station.
- Aamby Valley City - 22 km (14 mi) from Lonavala.
- Visapur Fort

== Gallery ==
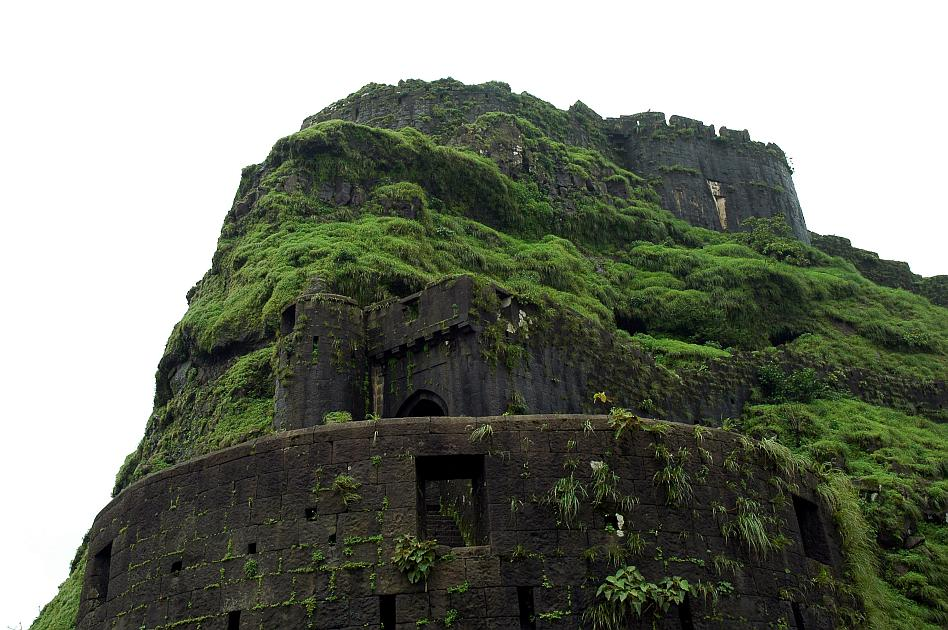
Lohagad fort walls

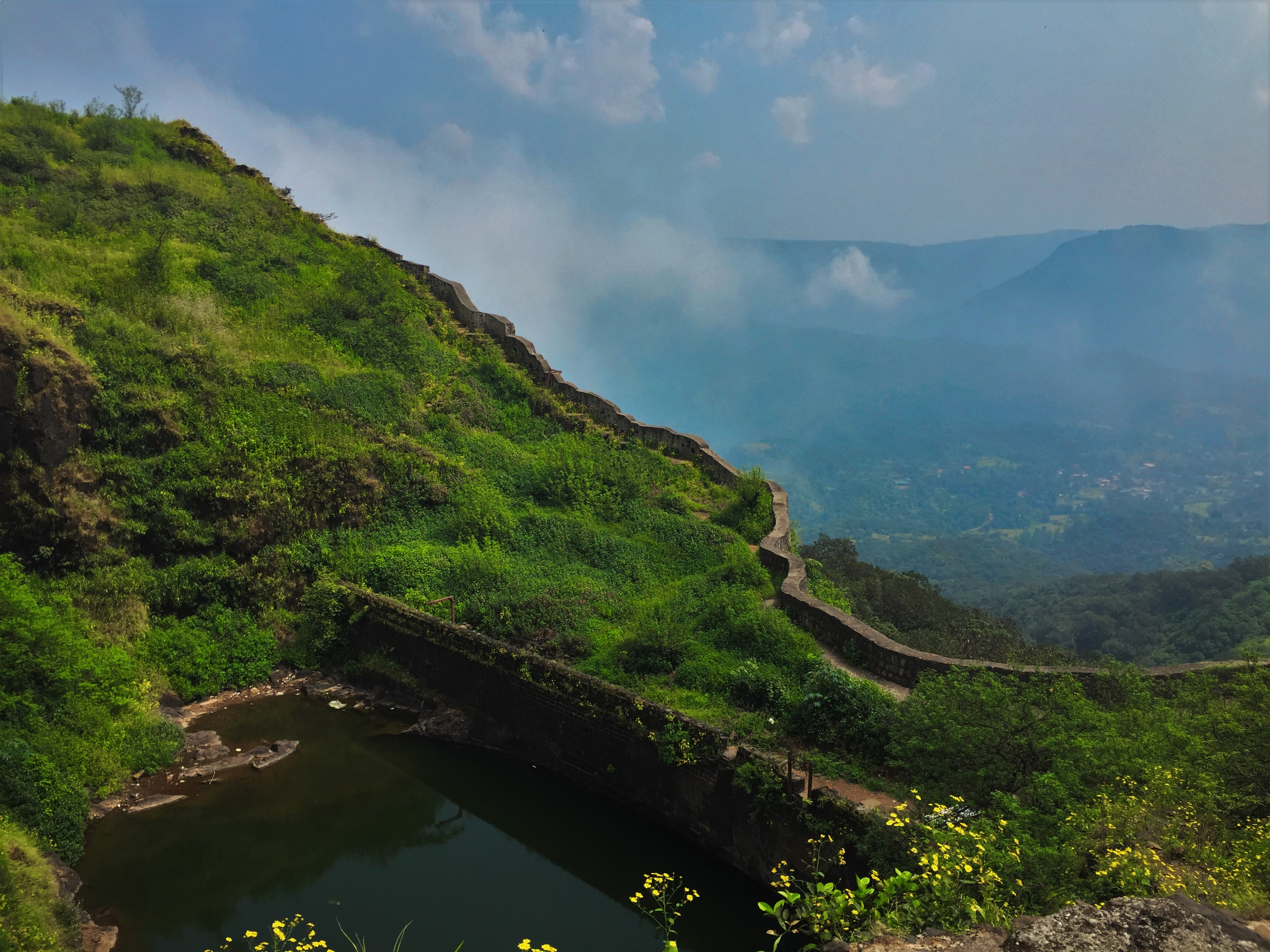

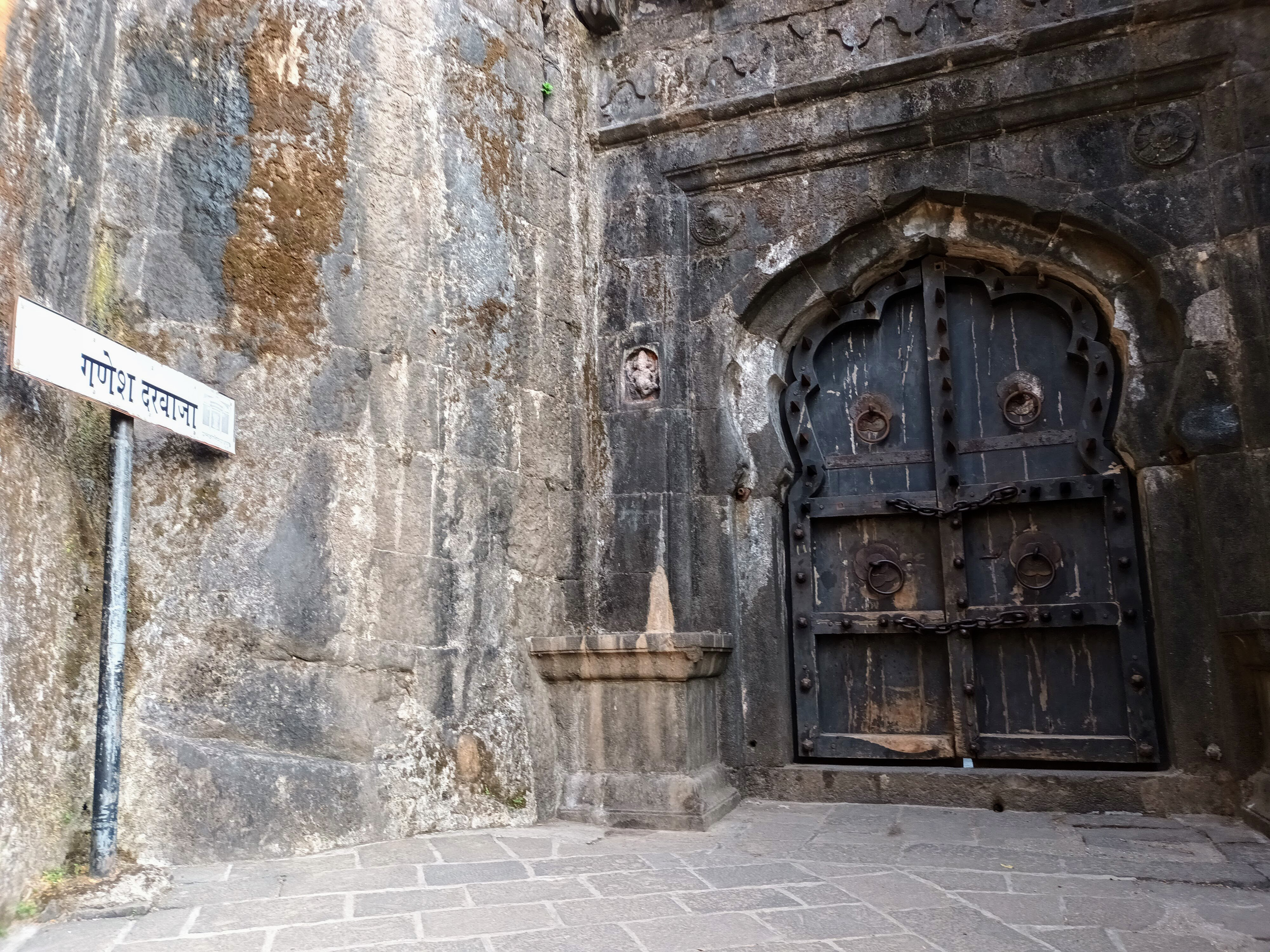
Ganesh Darwaja

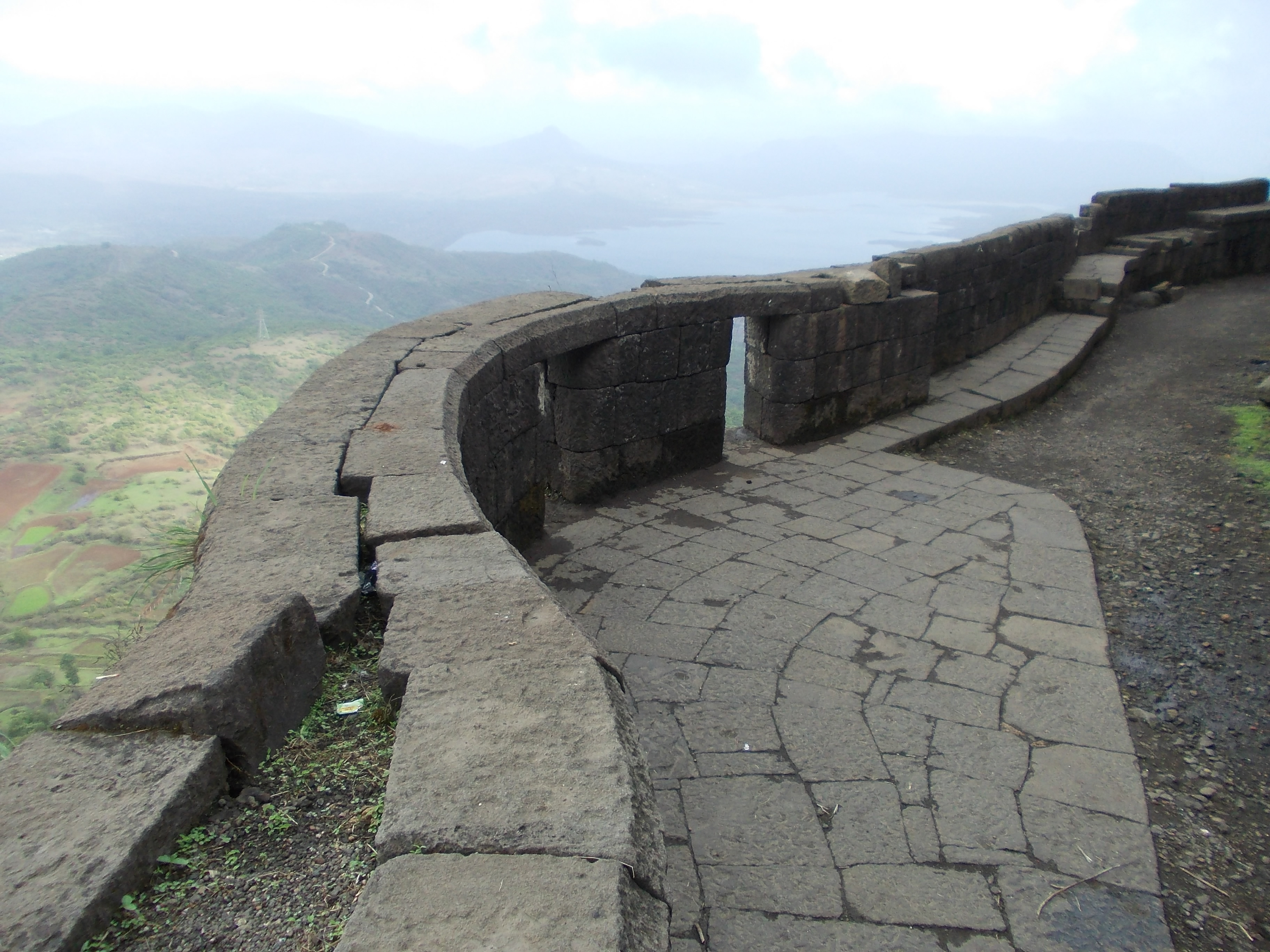
Wall fortification of Lohagad

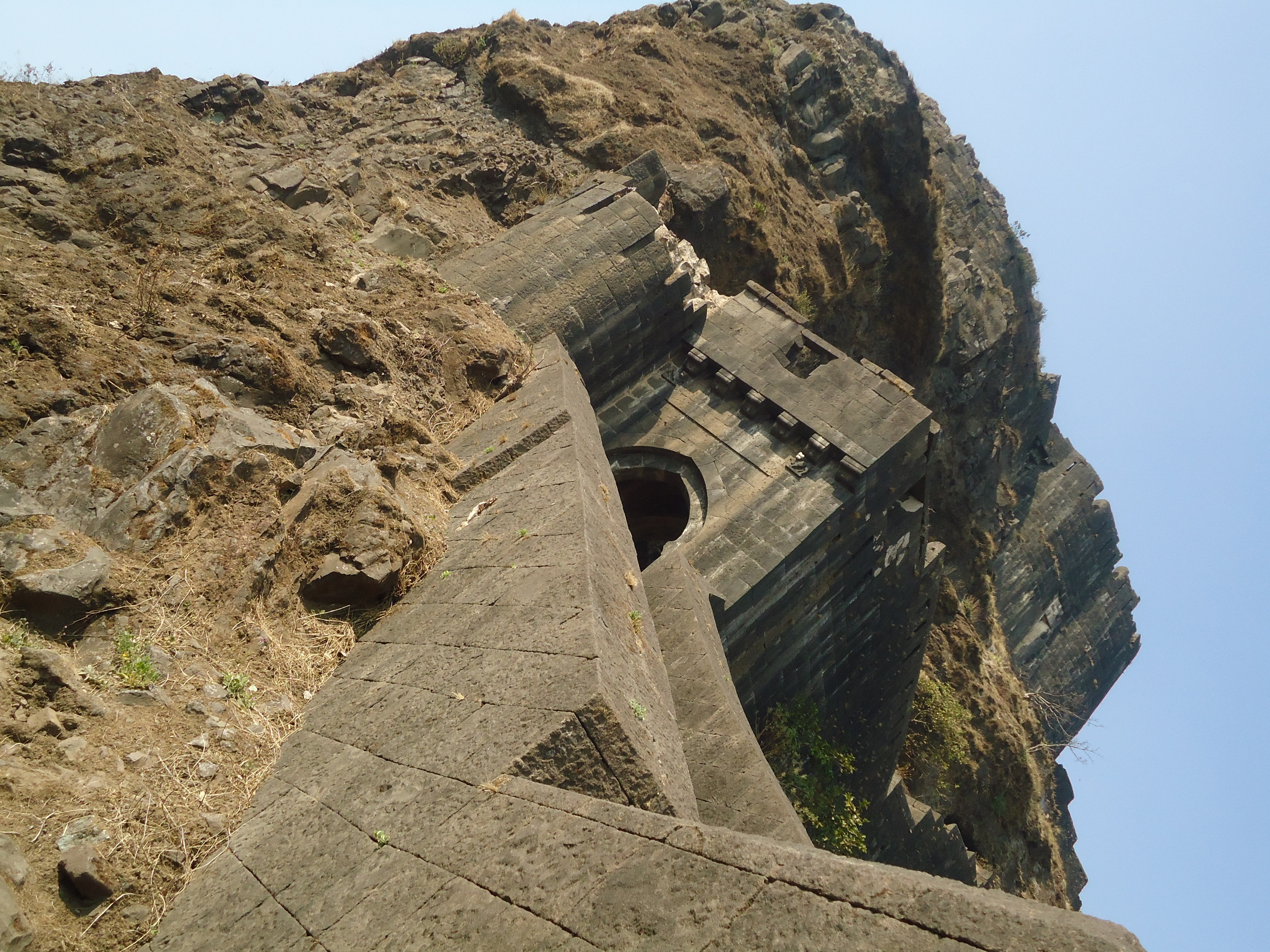

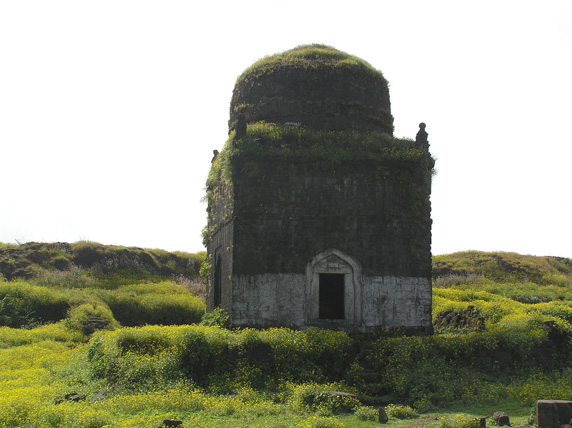

== See also ==
- List of forts in Maharashtra
