= Malavli =

- town
- Location within Maharashtra
- Coordinates: 18°44′41″N 73°28′54″E
- Country: India
- State: Maharashtra

Languages
  - Official: Marathi
- Time zone: UTC+5:30 (IST)

Malavli is a town and a hill station in Pune district in the Indian state of Maharashtra. It is about 55 km away from the city of Pune, 139 km away from the city Mumbai and 39 km from Chinchwad. It is a major stop on the rail line connecting Mumbai and Pune. For Mumbai suburbs local trains are available from Karjat. It is also an important town in order of Lonavala Khandala Malavli on the Mumbai-Pune road link. Both the Mumbai-Pune Expressway as well as the Mumbai-Pune highway pass through Malavli, Lonavala. The population of Lonavala is around 10,000 as of 2010.

== History ==
Present day Malavli was a part of the Yadava Empire. Later, the Mughals realized the strategic importance of the region and kept the region for an extended time. The forts in the region and the Mavla warriors played an important role in the history of the Maratha and Peshwa empires.

In 1871, the Lonavla and Khandala hill stations were discovered by Lord Elphinstone, who was the Governor of Bombay Presidency during those times.

== Tourism ==
Lonavla Khandala and Malavli are hill stations, in the Sahyadri ranges that demarcate the Deccan Plateau and the Konkan coast. The name Lonavla is derived from the Sanskrit lonavli, which refers to the many caves like Karla Caves, Bhaja Caves and Bedsa that are close to Lonavla. A trip to Malavli combined with sight-seeing visits of Karla, Bhaja and Bedsa caves and also the two fortresses, Lohagad and Visapur.

== Transport ==
By road: Malavli is situated on the halfway of Mumbai-Pune Expressway and is well connected to several other towns of Khopoli, Karjat, Talegaon dhabade, etc.

By Air: Lonavla has its own airport used by Indian Air Force on the way to Aamby Valley city. Nearest commercial airports are Pune at 59 km and Mumbai at 109 km

== See also ==
- Karla Caves
- Karli, India
- Indian rock-cut architecture
- List of rock cut temples in India
