= Kanheri Caves =

Buddhist cave having rock-cut architecture

- Kānherī-guhāḥ
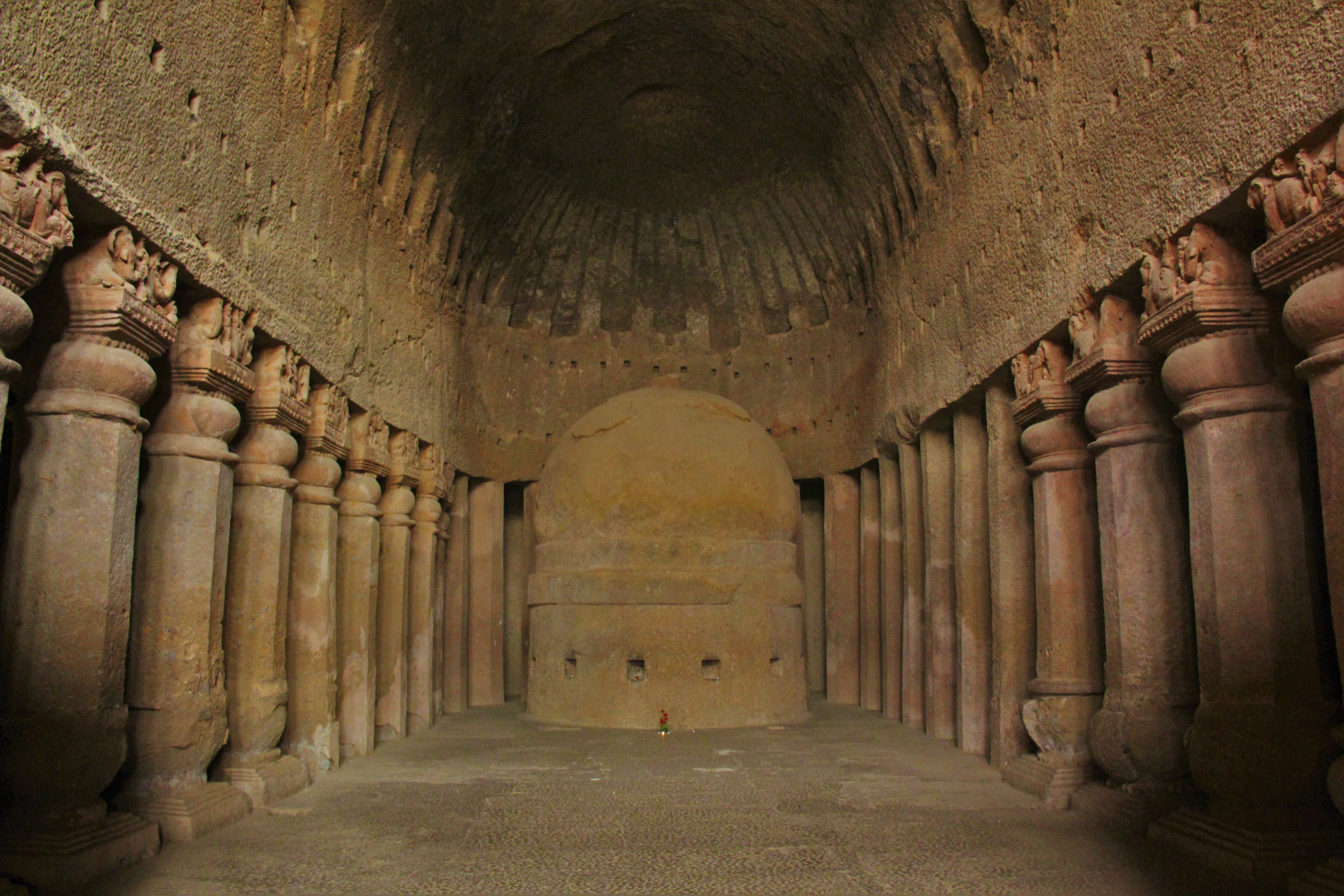
- Chaitya hall with stupa, Cave 3

- Location within India
- Location: Sanjay Gandhi National Park
- Coordinates: 19°12′30″N 72°54′23″E
- Geology: Basalt
- Entrances: 109

The Kanheri Caves (Kānherī-guhā [kaːnʱeɾiː ɡuɦaː]) are a group of caves and rock-cut monuments, cut into a massive basalt outcrop in the forests of the Sanjay Gandhi National Park, on the island of Salsette in the western outskirts of Mumbai, India. They contain Buddhist sculptures and relief carvings, paintings and inscriptions, dating from the 1st century CE to the 10th century CE. Kanheri comes from the Sanskrit Krishnagiri, which means "black mountain".

The site is on a hillside, and is accessible via rock-cut steps. The cave complex comprises one hundred and nine caves. The oldest are relatively plain and unadorned, in contrast to later caves on the site or the highly embellished Elephanta Caves of Mumbai. Each cave has a stone plinth that functioned as a bed. A congregation hall with huge stone pillars contains a stupa (a Buddhist pagoda). Rock-cut channels above the caves fed rainwater into cisterns, which provided the complex with water. Once the caves were converted to permanent monasteries, their walls were carved with intricate reliefs of the Buddha and bodhisattvas. The Kanheri caves were built in the 1st century and had become an important Buddhist settlement on the Konkan coast by the 3rd century CE.

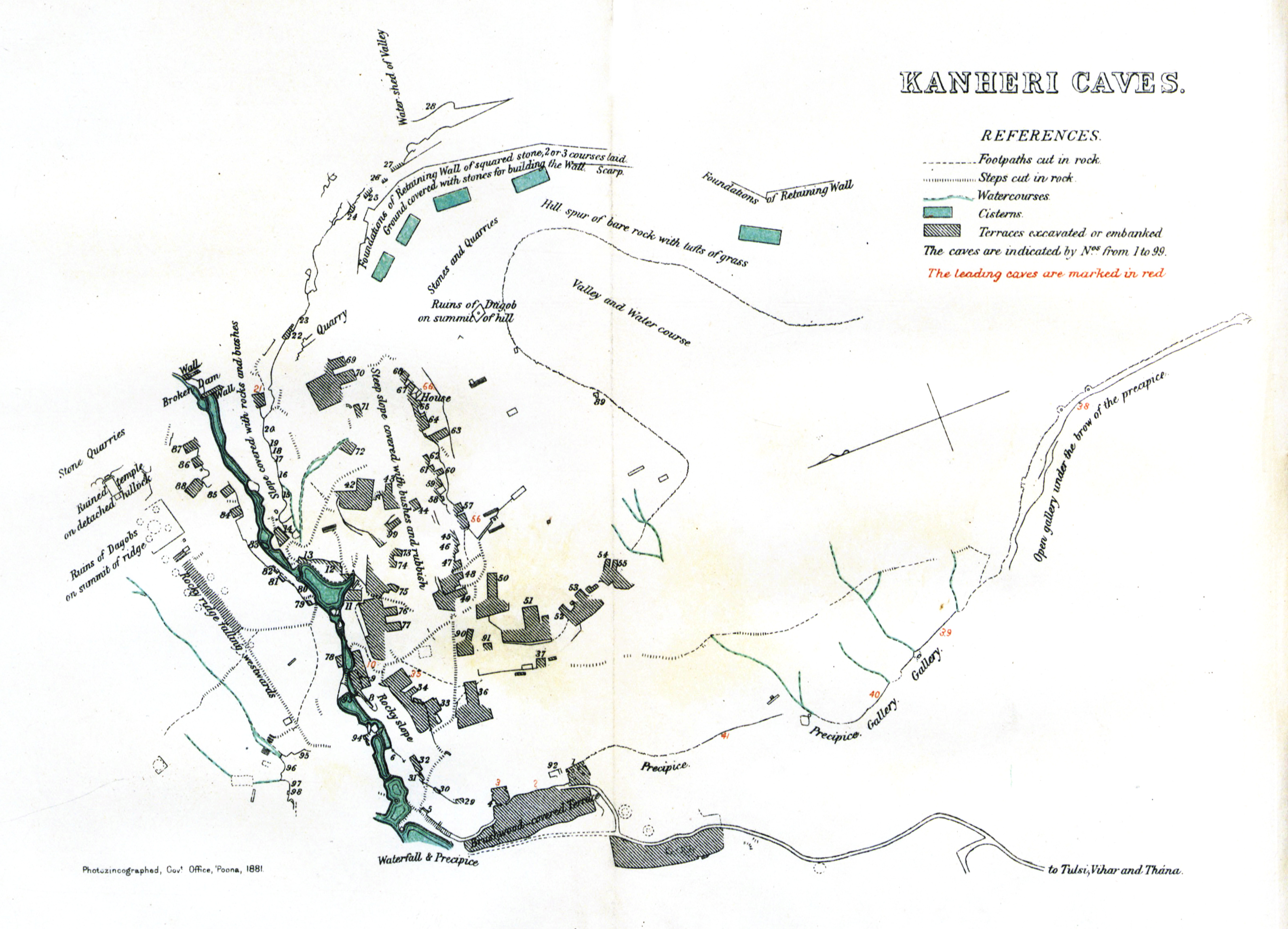
Map (1881)

Most of the caves were Buddhist viharas, meant for living, studying, and meditating. The larger caves, which functioned as chaityas, or halls for congregational worship, are lined with intricately carved Buddhist sculptures, reliefs, pillars and rock-cut stupas. Avalokiteshwara is the most distinctive figure. The large number of viharas indicates there was a well organized establishment of Buddhist monks. This establishment was also connected with many trade centers, such as the ports of Sopara, Kalyan, Nasik, Paithan and Ujjain. Kanheri was a university center by the time the area was under the rule of the Maurayan and Kushan empires. In the late 10th century, the Buddhist teacher Atisha (980–1054) came to the Krishnagiri Vihara to study Buddhist meditation under Rahulagupta.

== Inscriptions at Kanheri ==
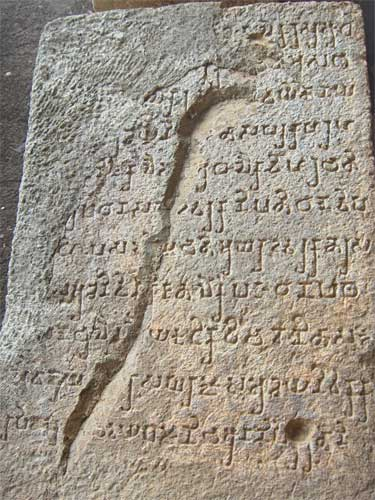
A Brāhmī stone inscription at Kanheri, veranda of the Great Chaitya.

Nearly 51 legible inscriptions and 26 epigraphs are found at Kanheri, which include inscriptions in Brahmi, Devanagari and 3 Pahlavi epigraphs found in Cave 90. One of the significant inscriptions mentions the marriage of Satavahana ruler Vashishtiputra Satakarni with the daughter of Rudradaman I:

"Of the queen ... of the illustrious Satakarni Vasishthiputra, descended from the race of Karddamaka kings, (and) daughter of the Mahakshatrapa Ru(dra)....... .........of the confidential minister Sateraka, a water-cistern, the meritorious gift.

— Kanheri inscription of Rudradaman I's daughter".

There are also two inscriptions of Yajna Sri Satakarni (170-199 CE), in cave No. 81, and in the Chaitya cave No. 3.

A 494-495 CE inscription found at Kanheri mentions the Traikutaka dynasty.

== Description of the caves ==
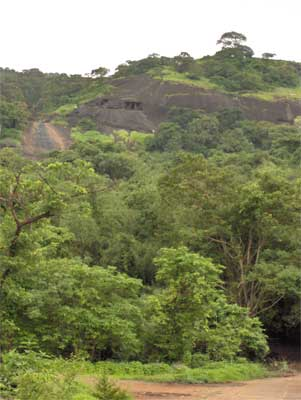
The caves as viewed from the base of the hill.

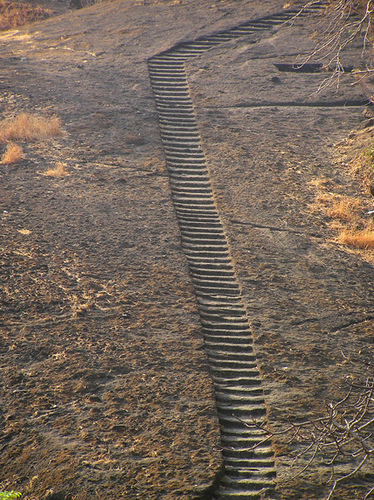
Rock cut stair leading to Kanheri.

The Island of Salsette, or Shatshashthi, at the head of Mumbai harbour, is uniquely rich in rock-cut temples, with works of this kind found at Kanheri, Marol, Magathane, Mahakali Caves, Mandapeshwar Caves, and Jogeshwari Caves. Kanheri lies a few miles from Thane, and contains the most extensive series in this grouping, with about 109 separate caves.

With easy access from Mumbai and Vasai, the caves attracted attention early in the colonial eras. They were described by Portuguese visitors in the 16th century and by European voyagers and travellers like Linschoten, Fryer, Gemelli Careri, Anquetil Du Perron and others.

The cave grouping sits about six miles from Thane, and two miles north of the Tulsi lake (recently formed to increase the water supply of Mumbai). The caves are excavated within one large hill and situated in the midst of an immense tract of forest country. Most of the hills in the neighborhood are covered with jungle, but this one is nearly bare, its summit being formed by a large, rounded mass of compact rock, under which a softer stratum has in many places been washed out by the rains, thus forming natural caves. It is in the stratum below this that most of the excavations are situated. The cave rock is a volcanic breccia, which forms the whole of the hilly district of the island, culminating to the north of the caves in a point about 1,550 feet above the sea level.

There are considerable differences in the ages of the excavations, but some of their dates may generally be ascertained from the characters of the numerous inscriptions that exist upon them. Cave architecture is generally simple, with most of the excavations consisting of a single small room with a stone bed, fronted usually with a little veranda and supported by two plain square or octagonal shafts. In the larger and more ornate caves the architecture is as important as elsewhere. Today, we can note that colonial writers such as James Fergusson, steeped in Orientalism and often comparing it to Greco-Roman architecture, perhaps ignorantly described the Kanheri architecture as "certainly primitive", even though the engineering science of these monks' abodes predates the Christian era.

One cave (No. 81) of this type in the ravine, consists of a very narrow porch, without pillars, a room with a stone bench along the walls, and a cell to the left. It bears an inscription of Yajna Sri Satakarni of the Satavahanas of the 2nd century CE, and it is probable that other caves in the same plain style range from the second to the fourth century CE. Other caves are covered inside with sculptures of a later Mahayana type, and some have inscriptions which may date as late as the middle of the ninth century.

The existence of so many monastic dwellings in this locality is partly accounted for by the neighborhood of so many thriving towns. Among the places mentioned as the residences of donors to cave architecture, occur the names of Surparaka (the "Supara" of the Greek and "Subara" of Arab writers); the ancient capital of the northern Konkan; Kalyan, long a thriving port; Chemula, the "Samylla" of Greek geographers, on the island of Trombay; and Vasya (perhaps Vasai or Bassein). "Sri Staanaka" (modern day Thane) and Ghodabandar were also thriving towns of those eras.

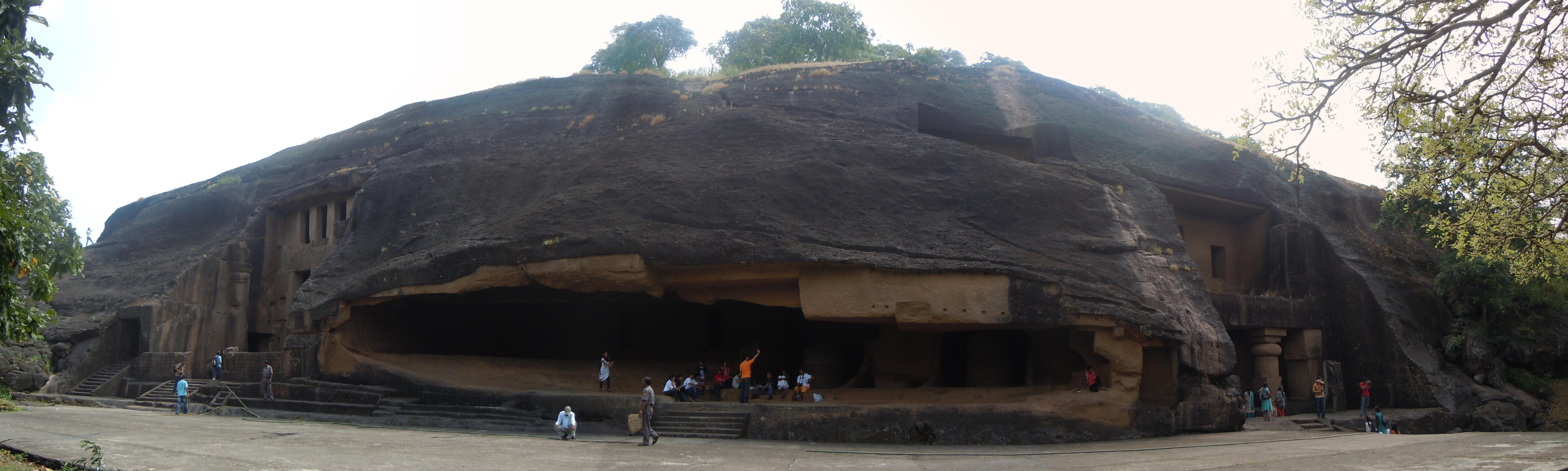
Panoramic view of Cave No.1 (right), Cave No.2 (center), Cave No.3 (left).

=== Cave No.1 ===
Cave No.1 is a Buddhist vihara, or monastery. The entrance is framed by two large pillars. The cave has two levels, but its construction is incomplete.

Cave No.1
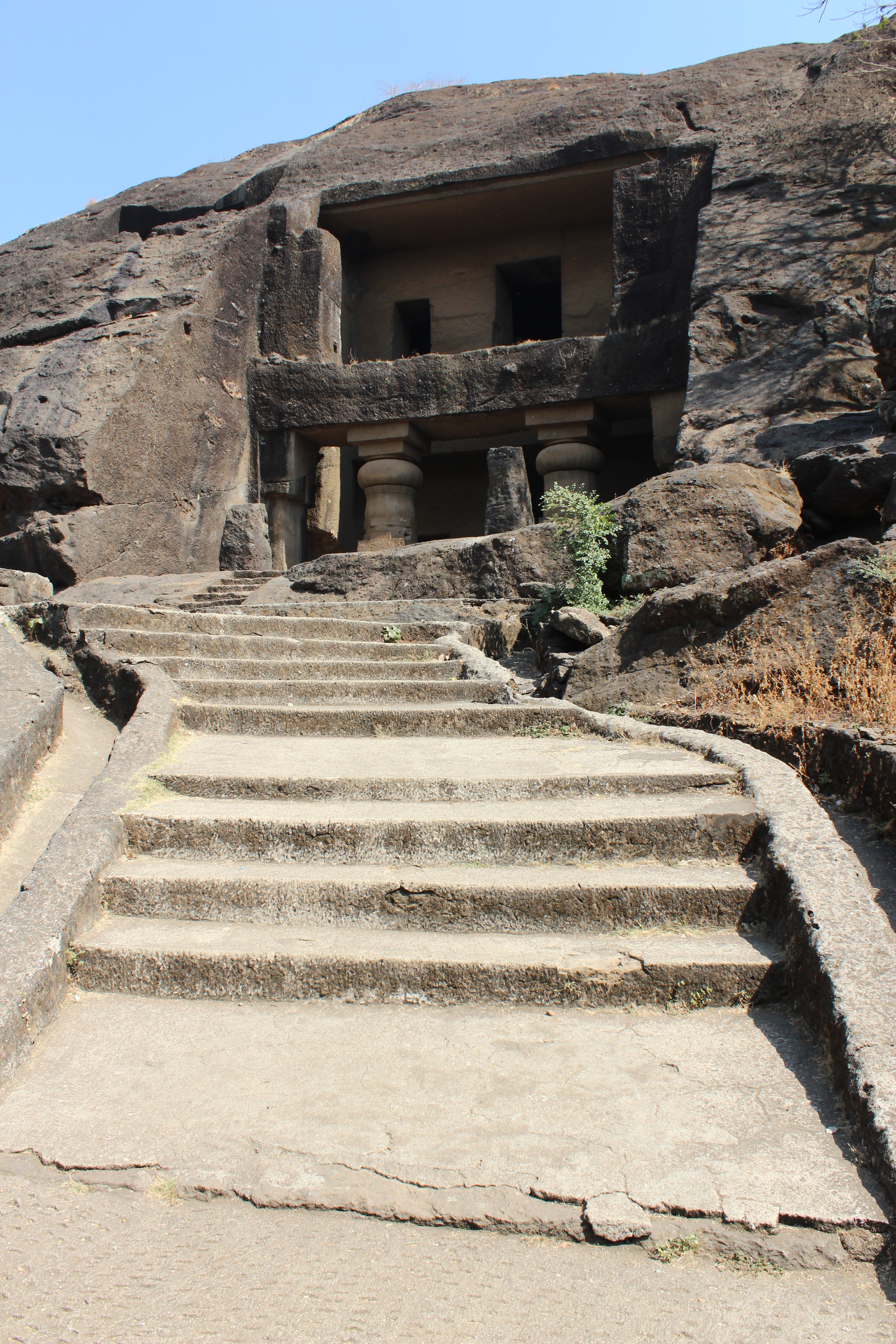

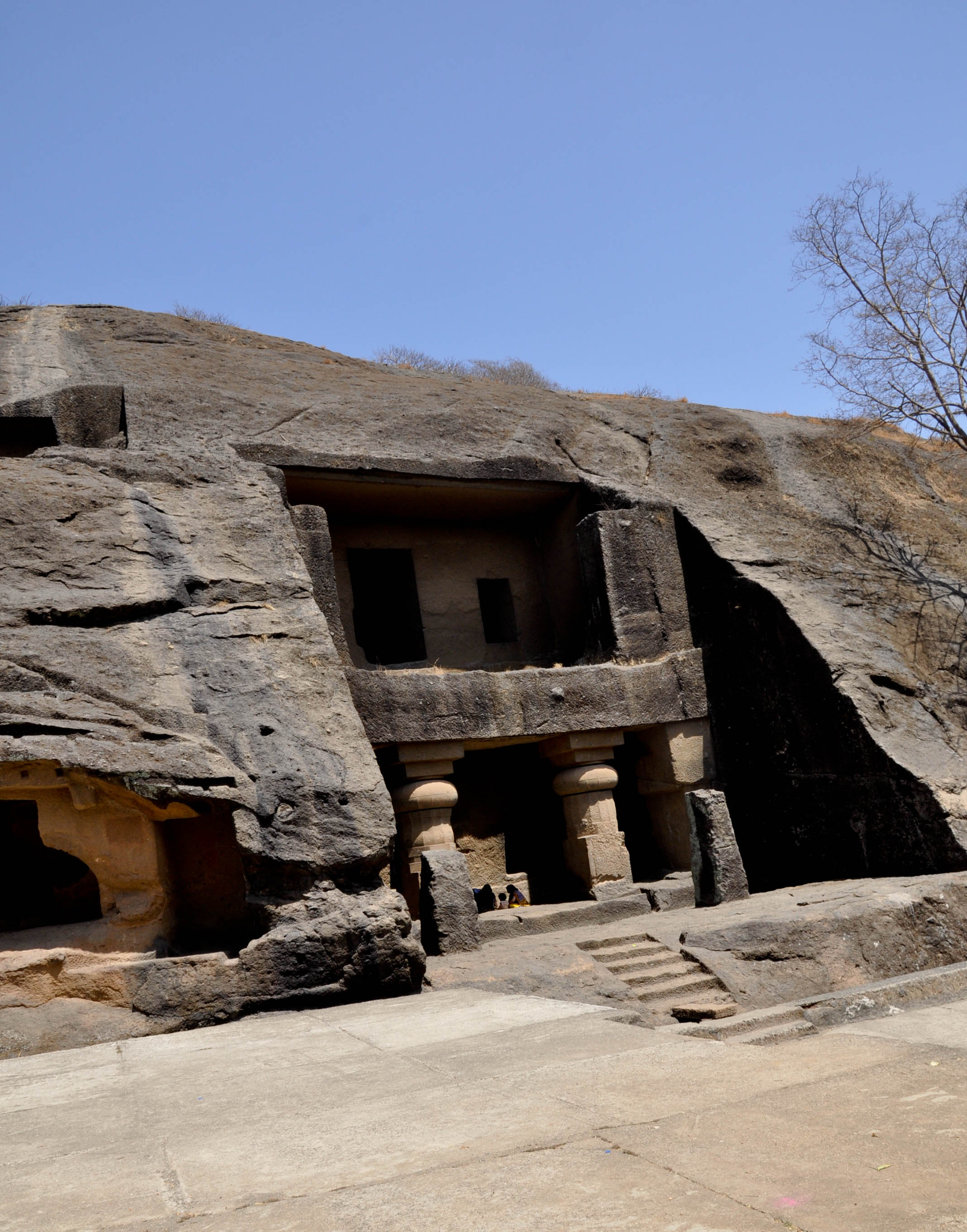

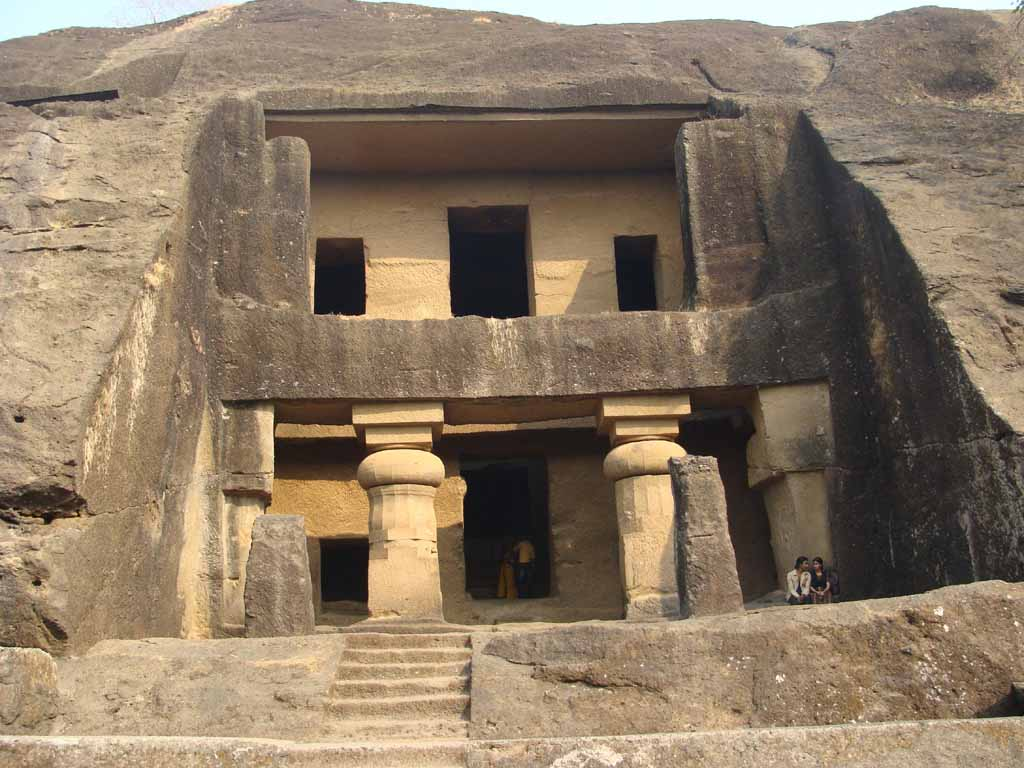

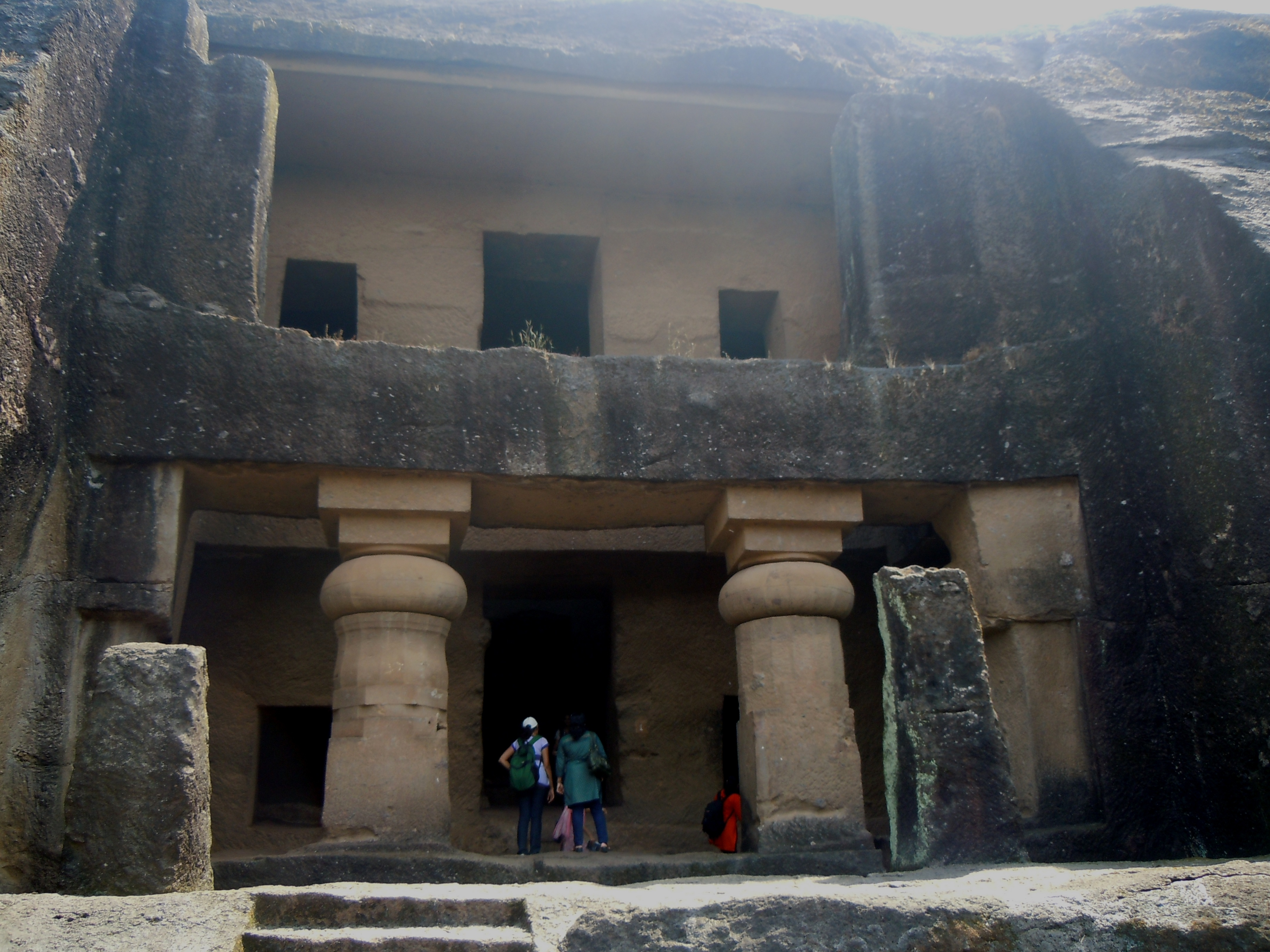

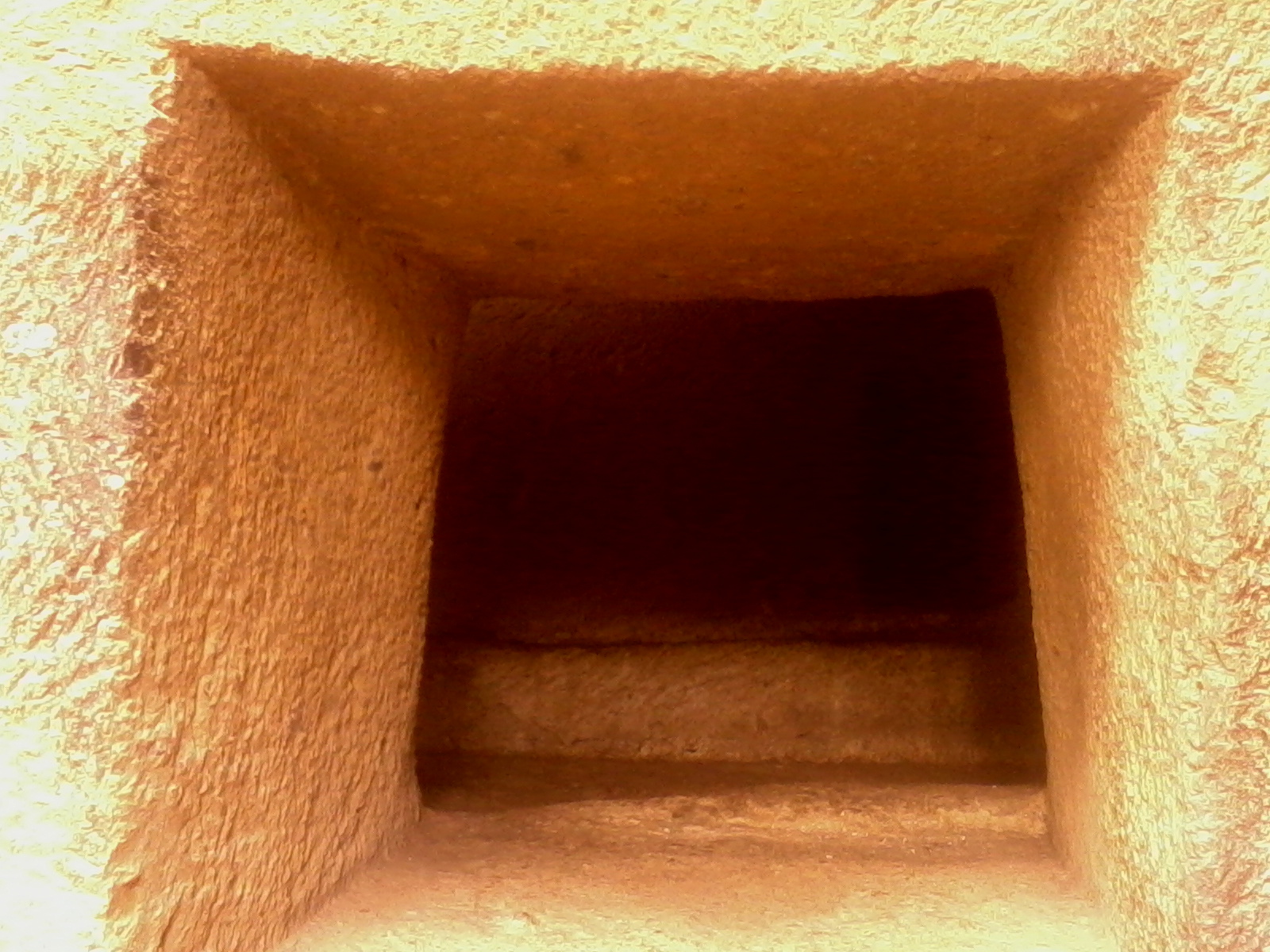
Interior

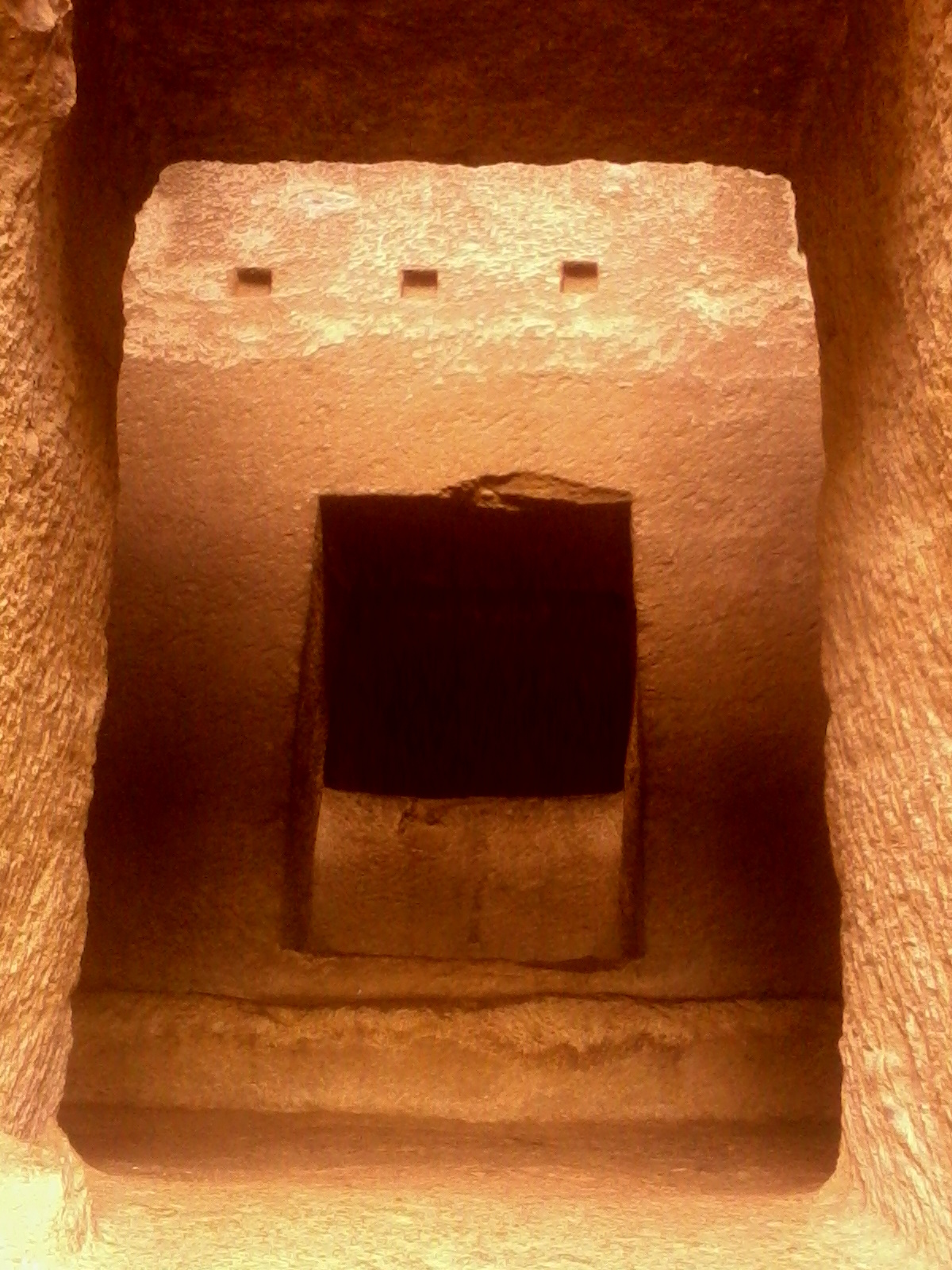
Interior

=== Cave No.2 ===
On the right of the court of the Great Chaitya is Cave No. 2, pressing very closely upon it. It is a long cave, open in front, and once contained three small stupas, also called dagobas, with one of them now broken off near the base. This cave and cave No. 4 are probably older than the Great Chaitya cave, which seems to have been thrust in between these two caves at a later date; however, this long room has been so much altered at different times that it is difficult to know its original arrangement. On the rock surrounding the dagoba are sculptures of Buddha and a litany, but all these are probably of later dates.

Cave No.2
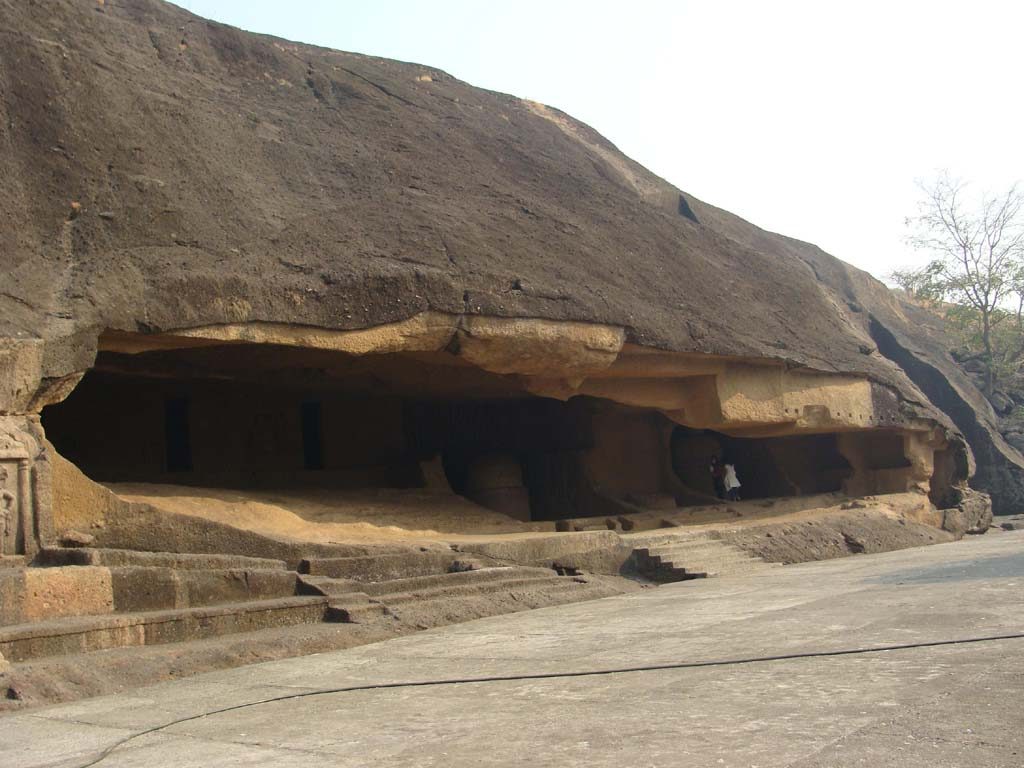
Cave No.2 (exterior)

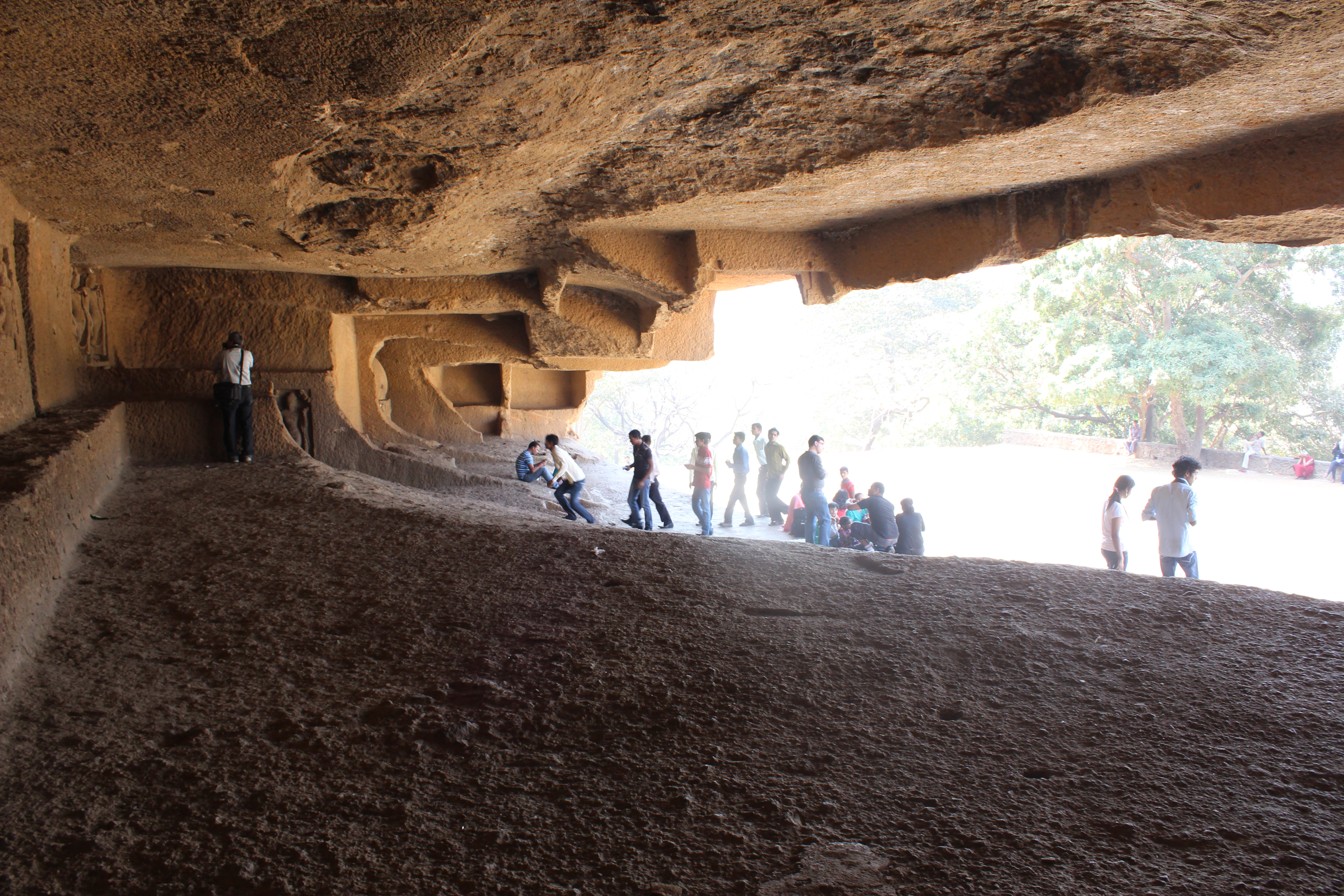
Cave No.2 (inside)

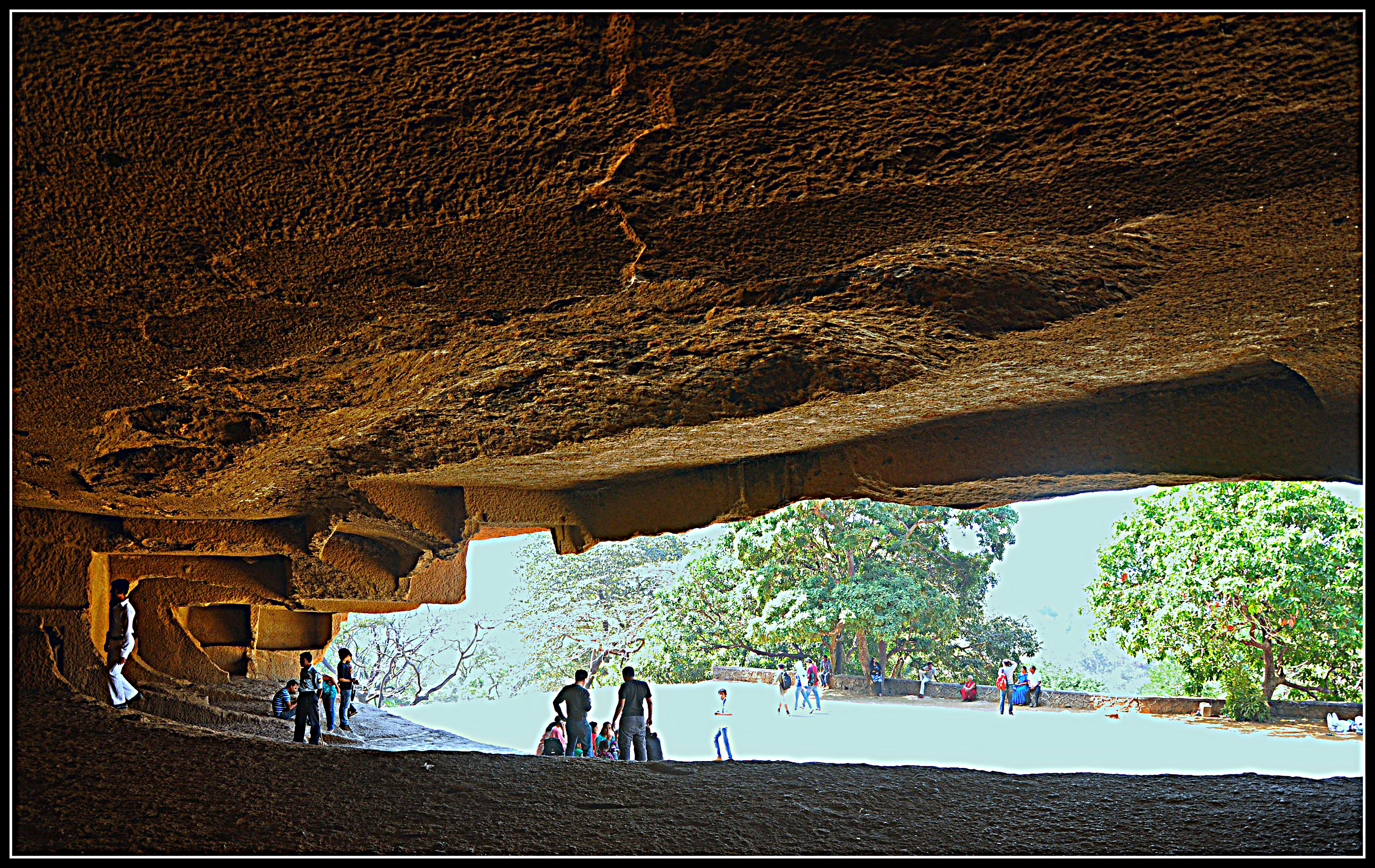
Cave No.2 (inside)

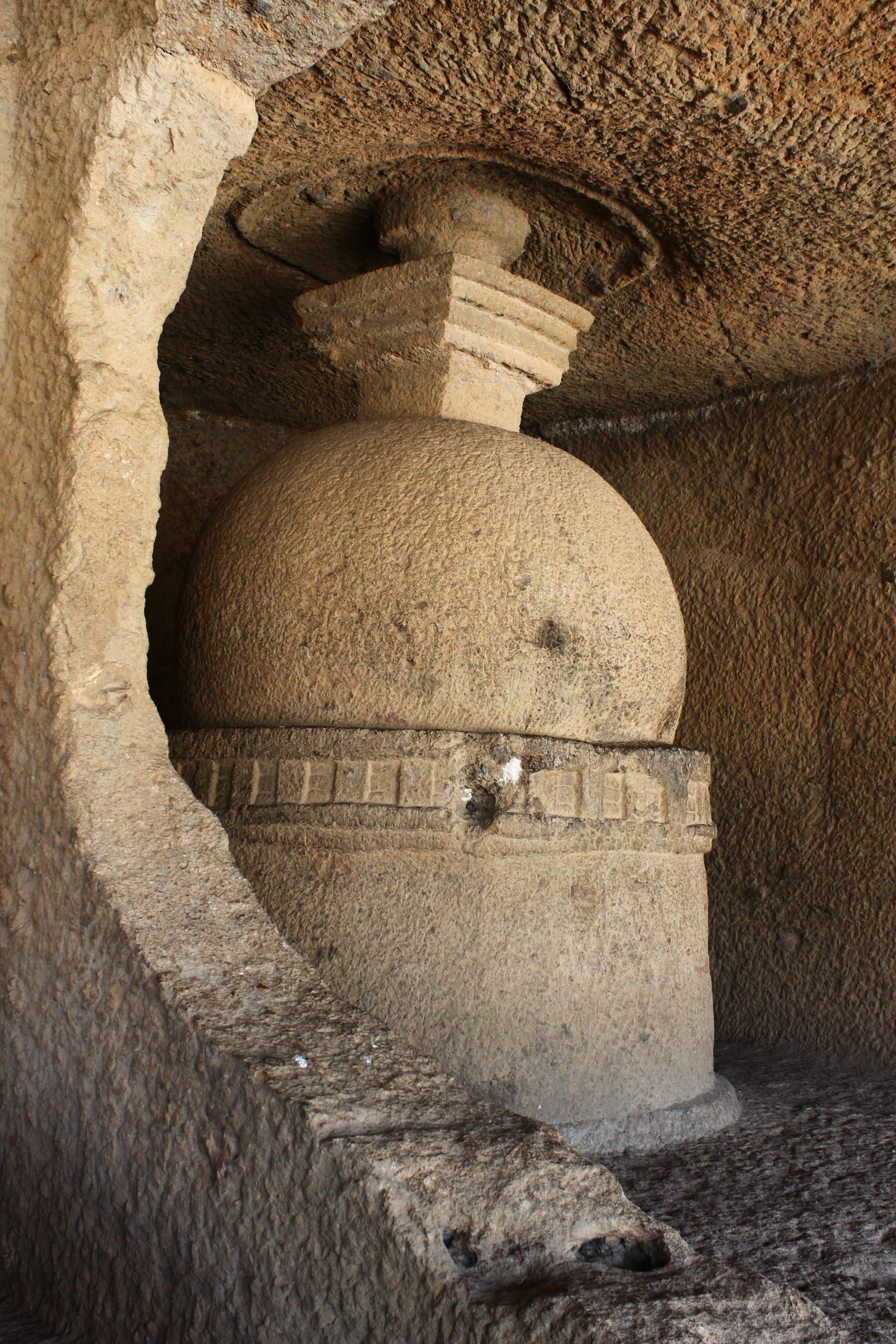
Stupa in Cave 2.

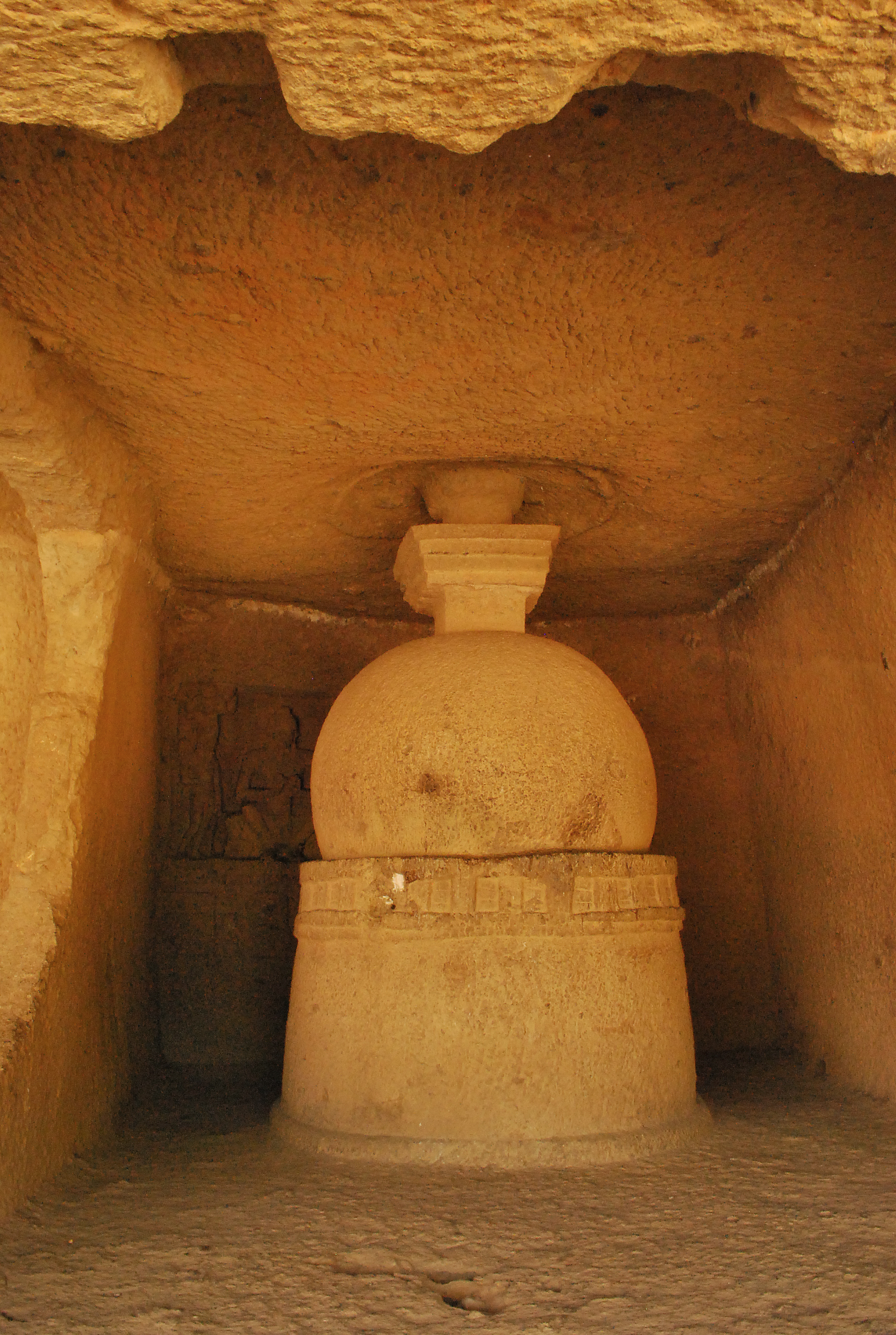
Stupa in Cave 2.

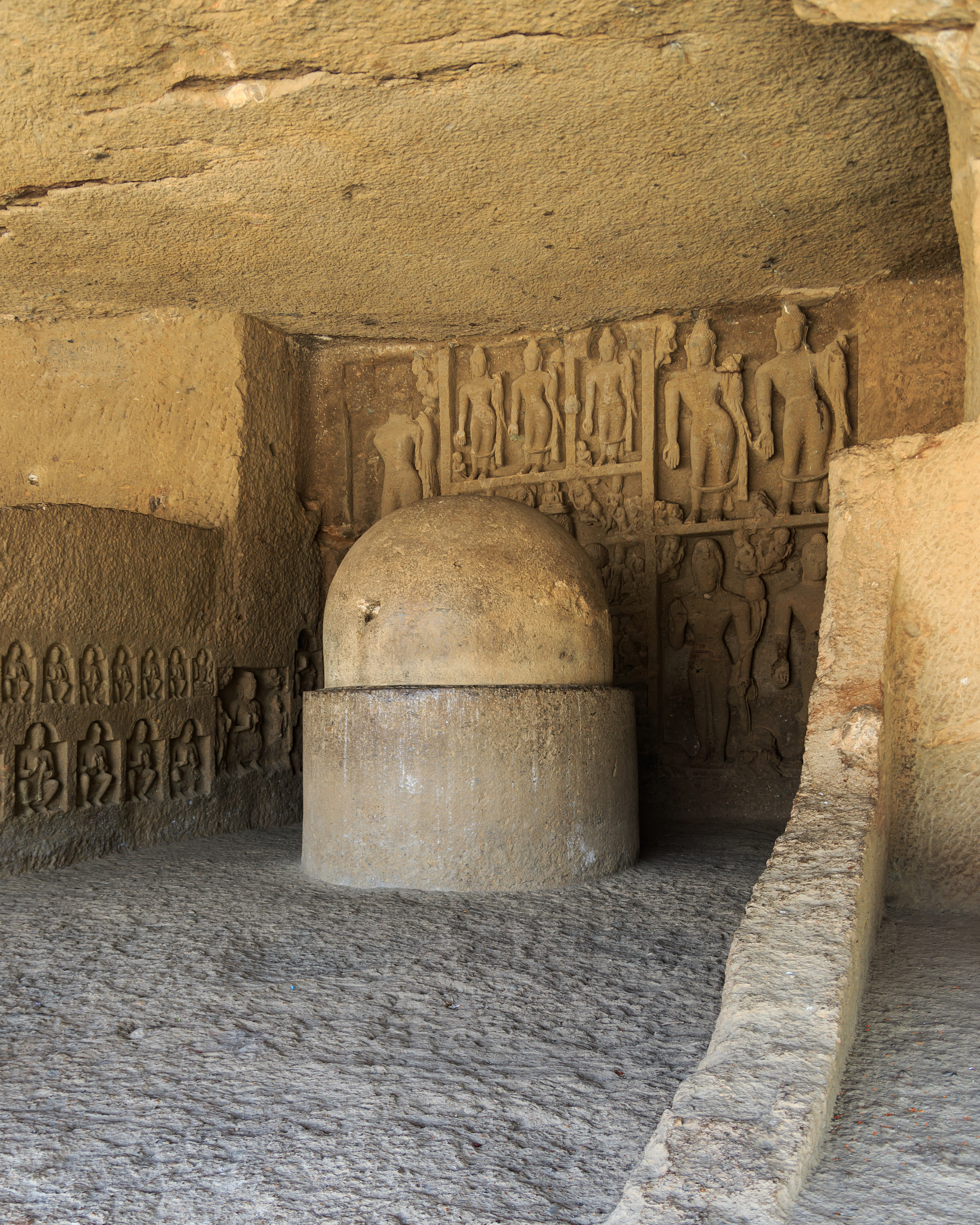
Stupa in Cave 2.

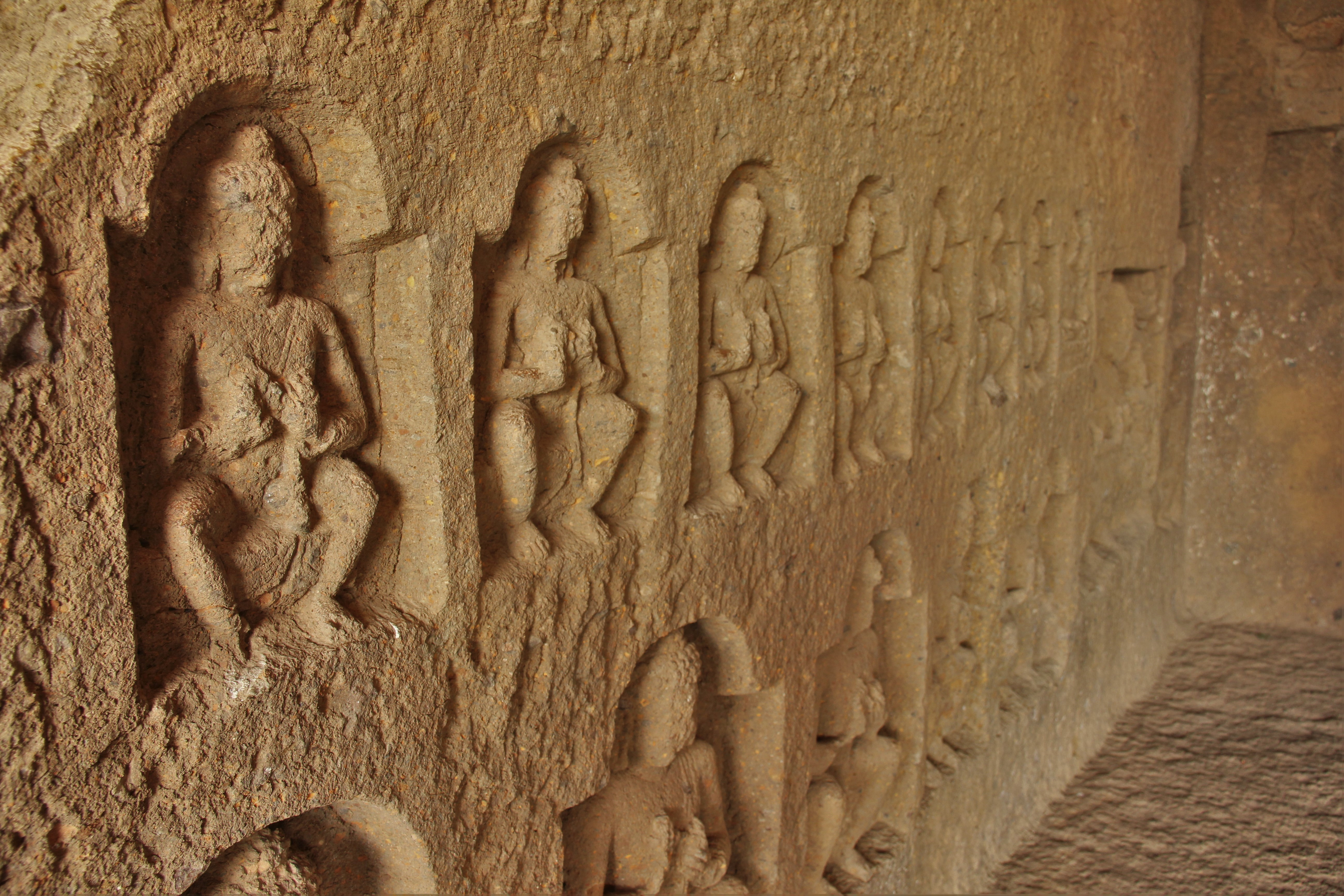
Sculptures in Cave 2.

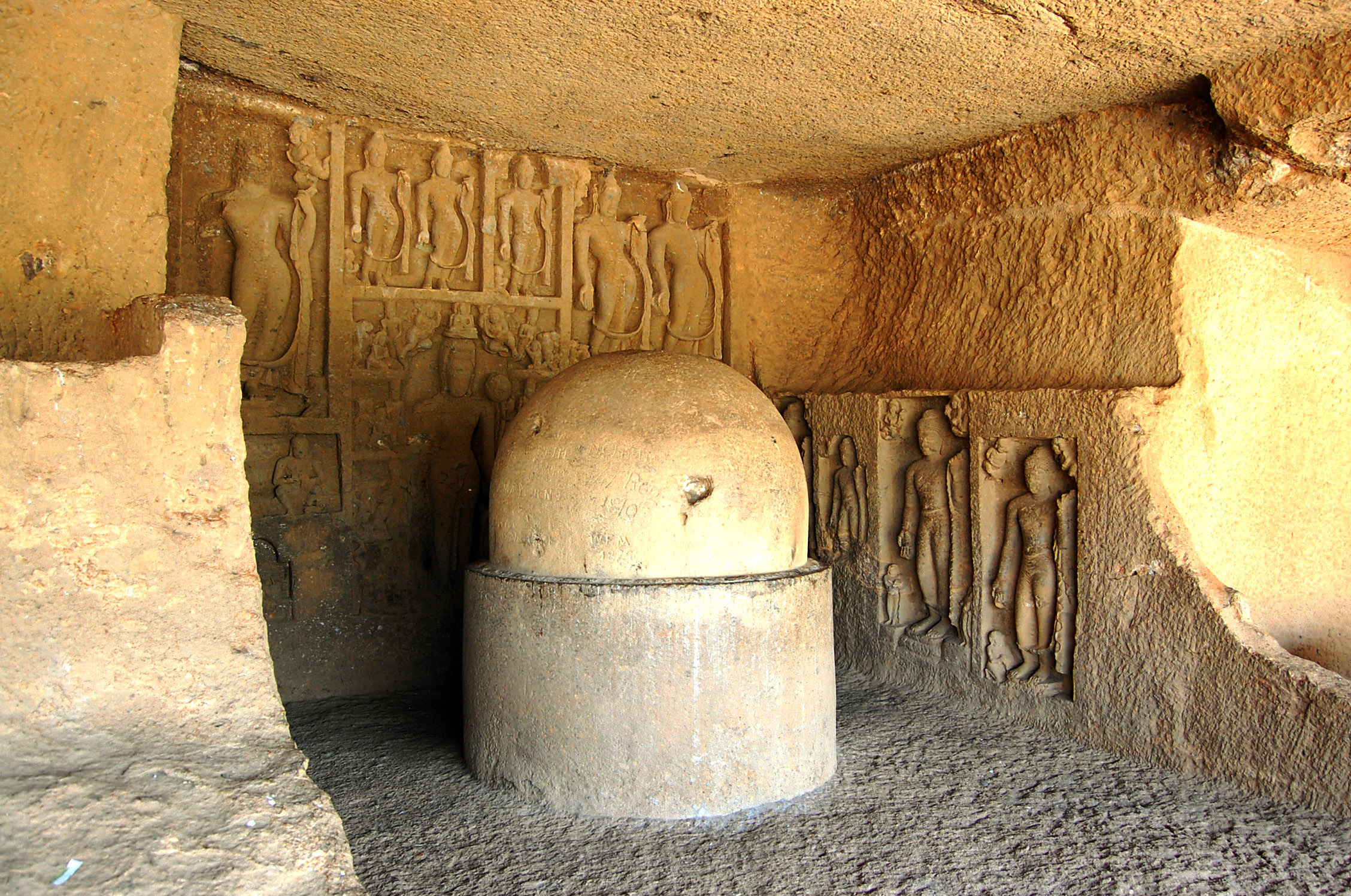
Sculptures in Cave 2.

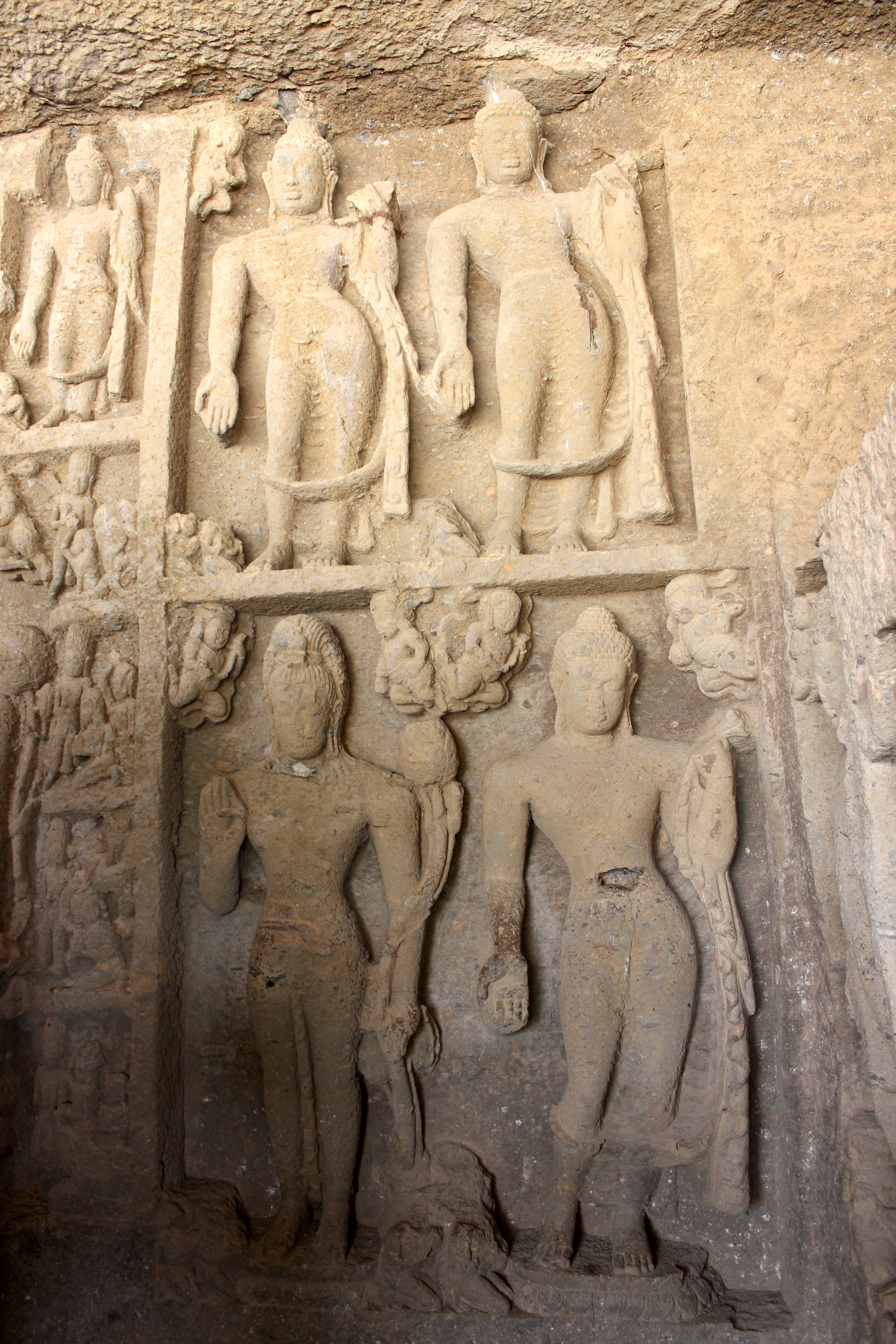

=== Great Chaitya (Cave No.3) ===
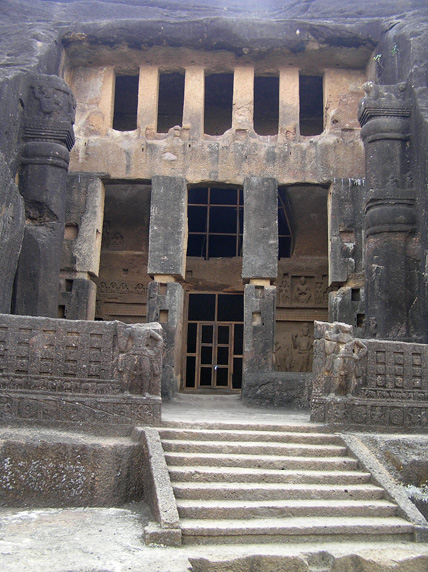
Great Chaitya cave (cave No.3).

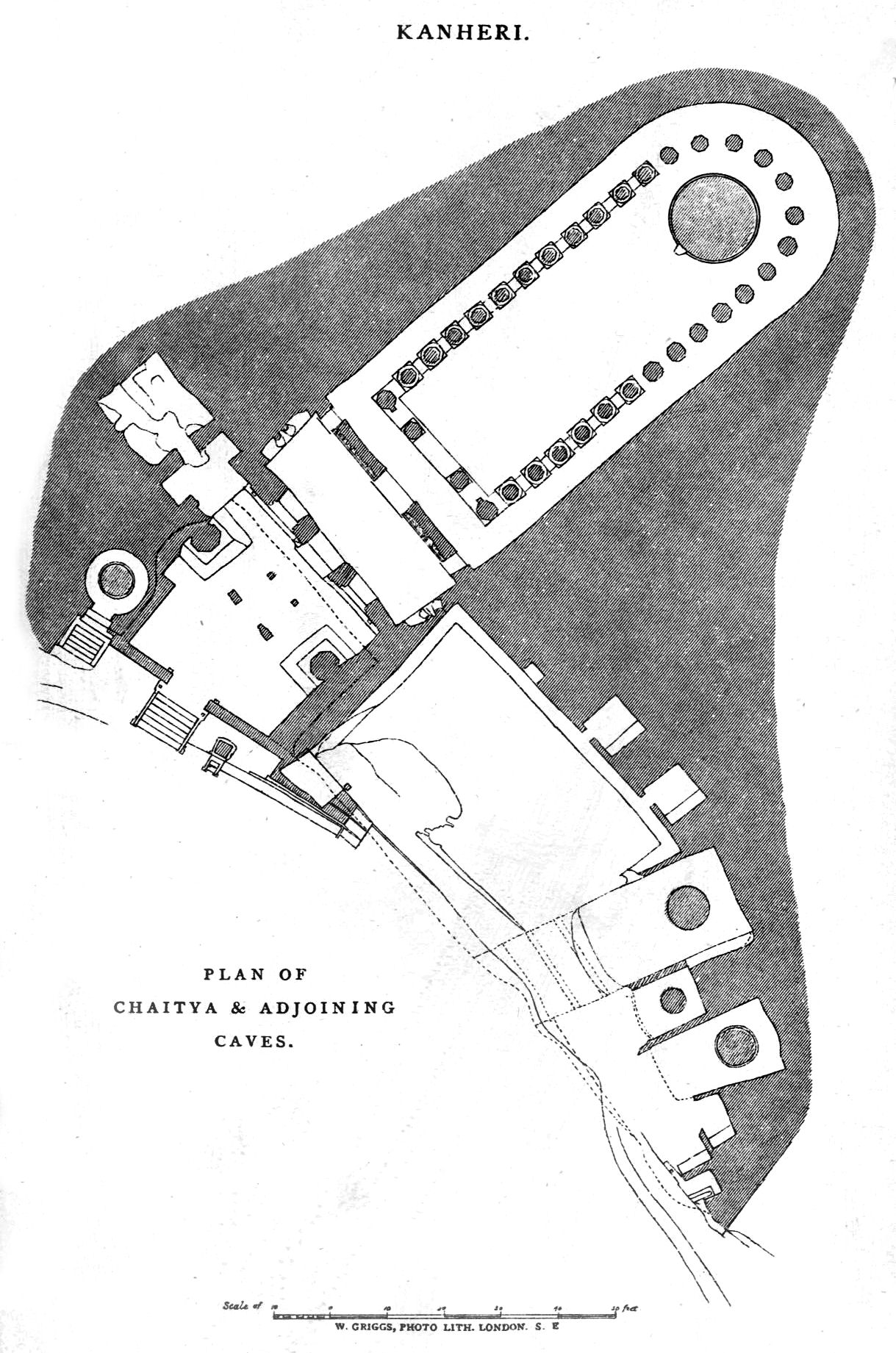
Plan of Kanheri Great Chaitya cave.

The cave first met on the way up the hill, and one of the most important, is the Great Chaitya cave. On the jamb of the entrance to the veranda is an inscription of Yajna Sri Satakarni (circa 170 CE), whose name also appears in cave No. 81. The inscription here is mutilated but decipherable. It is probable that the cave was excavated during Satakarni's reign.

From the style of its architecture, it can be stated with certainty that the Cave 17 at Nasik Caves is contemporary, or nearly so, with the Great Chaityas both at Kanheri and Karla. The Nahapana Cave at Karla (cave No.10) is a bit earlier than No. 17 at Nasik. The "Gautamiputra" Cave No. 3 (also at Nasik) succeeded these other caves after a considerable lapse of time; therefore, any caveworks sponsored by Yajna Sri Satakarni must have been executed within a short interval of time after the others. On the other hand, whatever its date may be, it is certain that the plan of the Kanheri Great Chaitya cave is a literal copy of that at the Karla Caves; the architectural details show the same differences in style as is found between Cave 17 and Cave 3 at Nasik.

If, for instance, we compare the capitals in this cave, with those of Karla, we find the same degradation of style as is seen between Nasik caves No. 10 and the later No. 3. The screen in front of this Kanheri cave, though weatherworn and difficult to draw, is of very nearly the same design seen at the Gautamiputra Cave of Nasik. Its design compilation of discs and animal forms seems to share a modernity also found at the Buddhist stupa site of Amaravathi, near the Eastern coast of southern India.

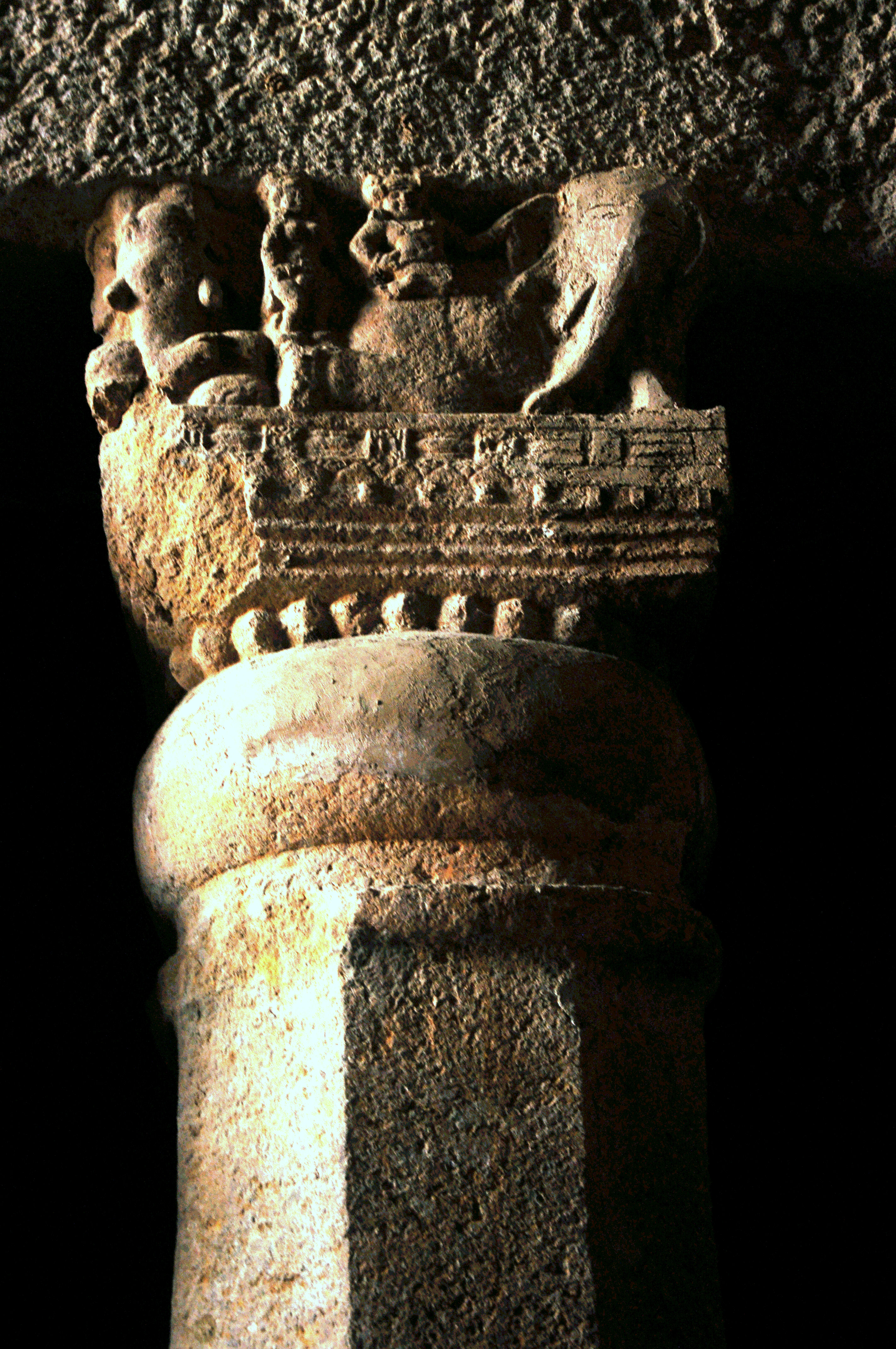
Kanheri Great Chaitya cave pillar capital.

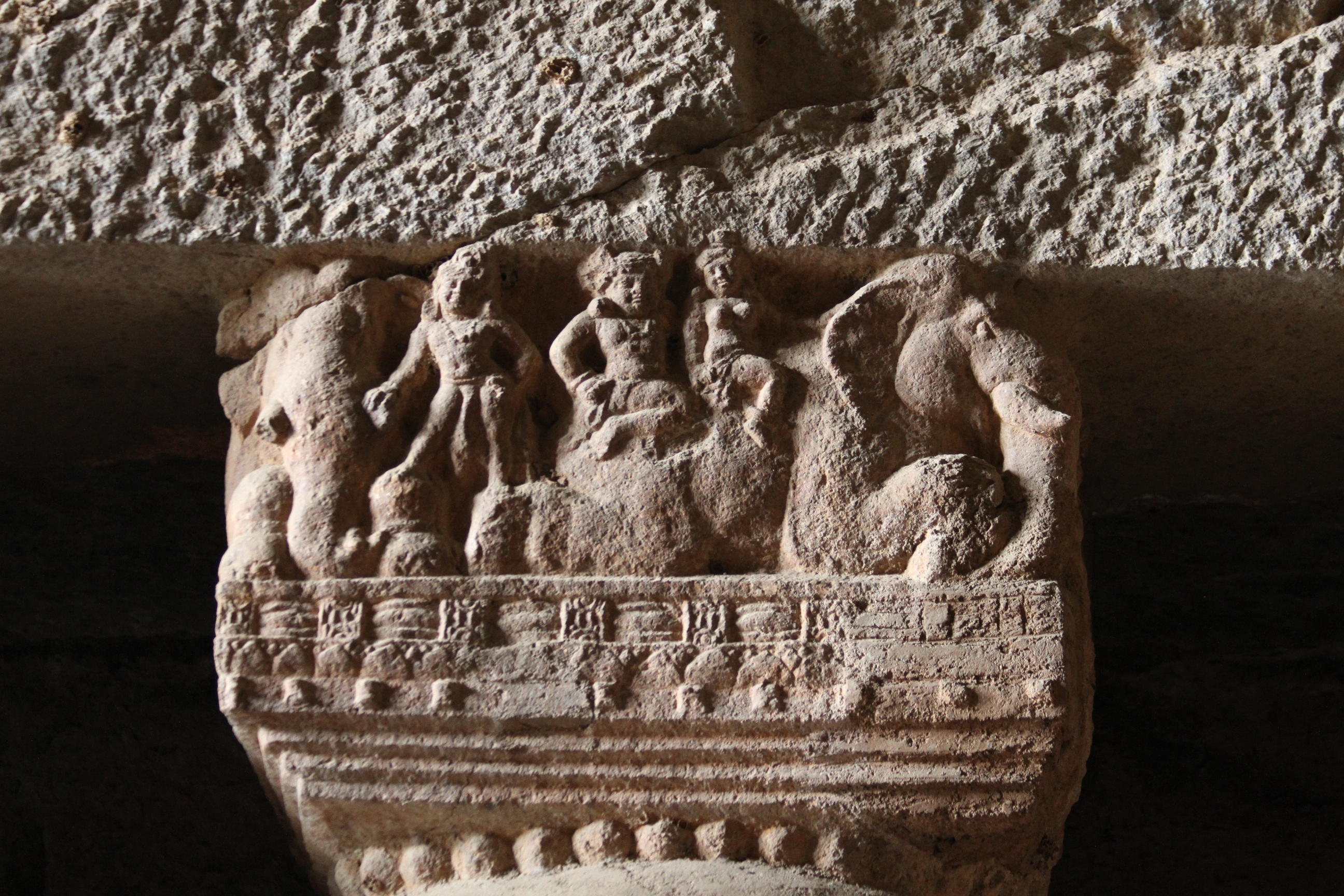
Detail of a capital.

Cave No. 3 is 86.5 feet long by 39 feet 10 inches wide from wall to wall. It has thirty-four pillars round the nave and the dagoba; only 6 on one side and eleven on the other have bases and capitals of the Karla chaitya-cave patterns, but not so well proportioned nor so spiritedly cut. Fifteen pillars round the apse of the cave are plain octagonal shafts. The stupa is nearly 16 feet in diameter but unadorned, with its capital destroyed; so also is all the woodwork of the arched roof. The aisle across the front is covered by a gallery under the great arched window; it is probable that the central portion of the front veranda was also covered in wood. Two colossal figures of Buddha, about 23 feet high, stand in relief at the northwest and southeast ends of this veranda, but they appear to be of considerably later date than the cave itself.

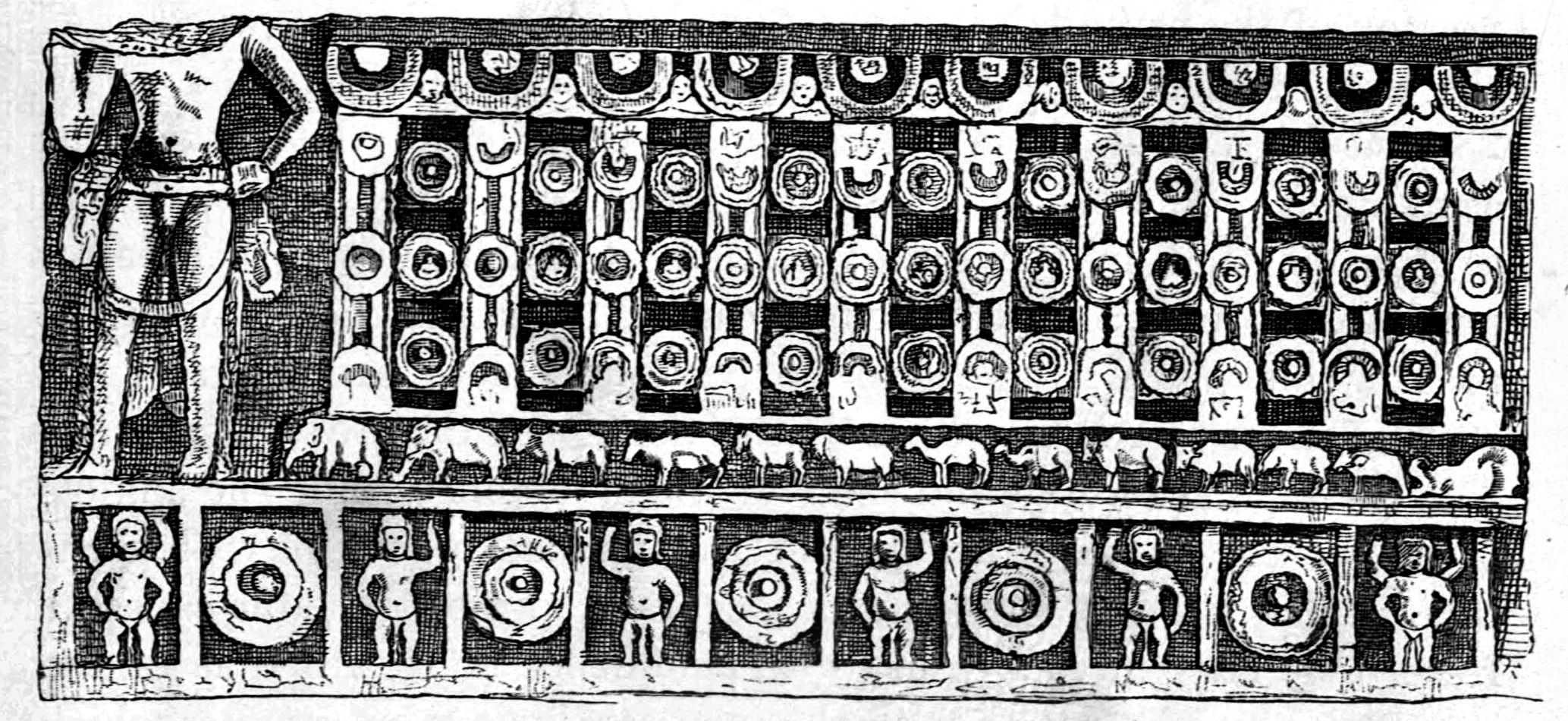
Screen in front of the cave.

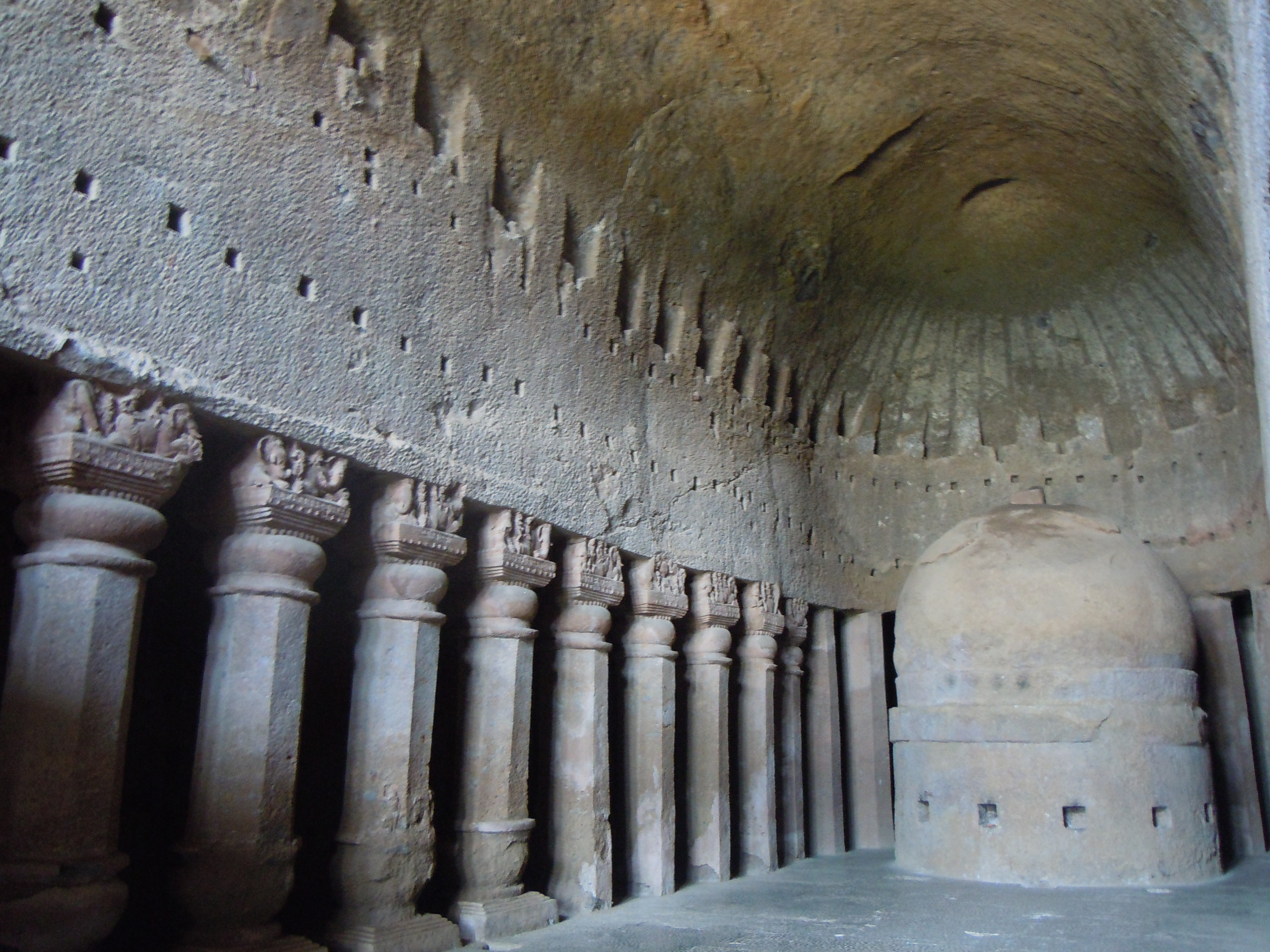
Great Chaitya hall and dagoba.

The sculptured front screen is a copy of Karla's and in the same position, but rather better executed; indeed, it holds the best carved figures in these caves. The cave rock happens to be close-grained, this granting a peculiarly unique beauty to the figures. The style of dress of the figures is that of the age of the great Satakarnis: the oblong earrings and anklets of the women are very heavy, with the male turbans wrought with great care. This style of dress never occurs in any of the later caves or frescoes. These sculptures may be dated with confidence as of the same age as the cave. Not so, however, with the images above them, including several of the Buddha and two standing figures of the bodhisattva Avalokiteswara, all belonging to a later period. This also applies to the figure of the Buddha in the front wall at the left end of the veranda, under which is an inscription containing the name of Buddhaghosa, in lettering of about the sixth century.

The verandah has two pillars in front, and the screen above contains five openings. In the left side of the court are two rooms, one entered through the other, but evidently of later date than the cave. The outer room bears a good deal of sculpture. On each side of the court is an attached pillar; on the top of the western pillar rest four lions, as at Karla; on the eastern pillar are three fat, squat figures, similar to those on the pillar in the court of the Jaina Cave (Indra Sabha) at Ellora; the squat figures probably supported a dharmachakra or dharma wheel. In front of the verandah there was once a wooden porch.

Great Chaitya (Cave No.3)
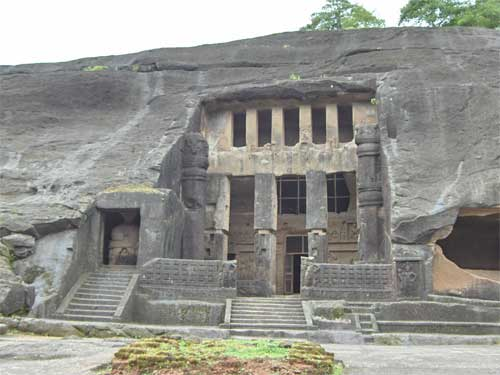
Exterior of the Great Chaitya.

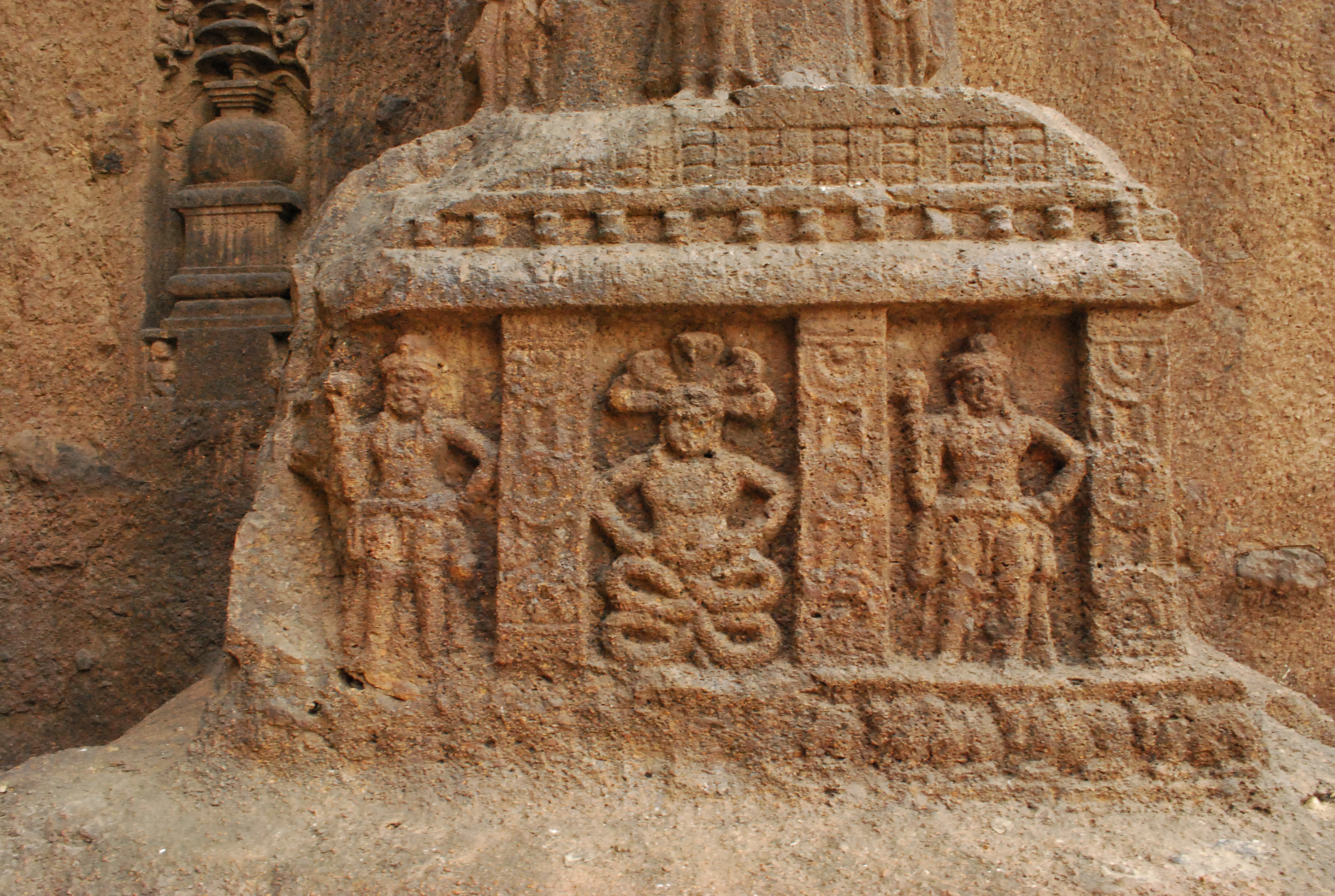
Bottom of the right pillar before the veranda.

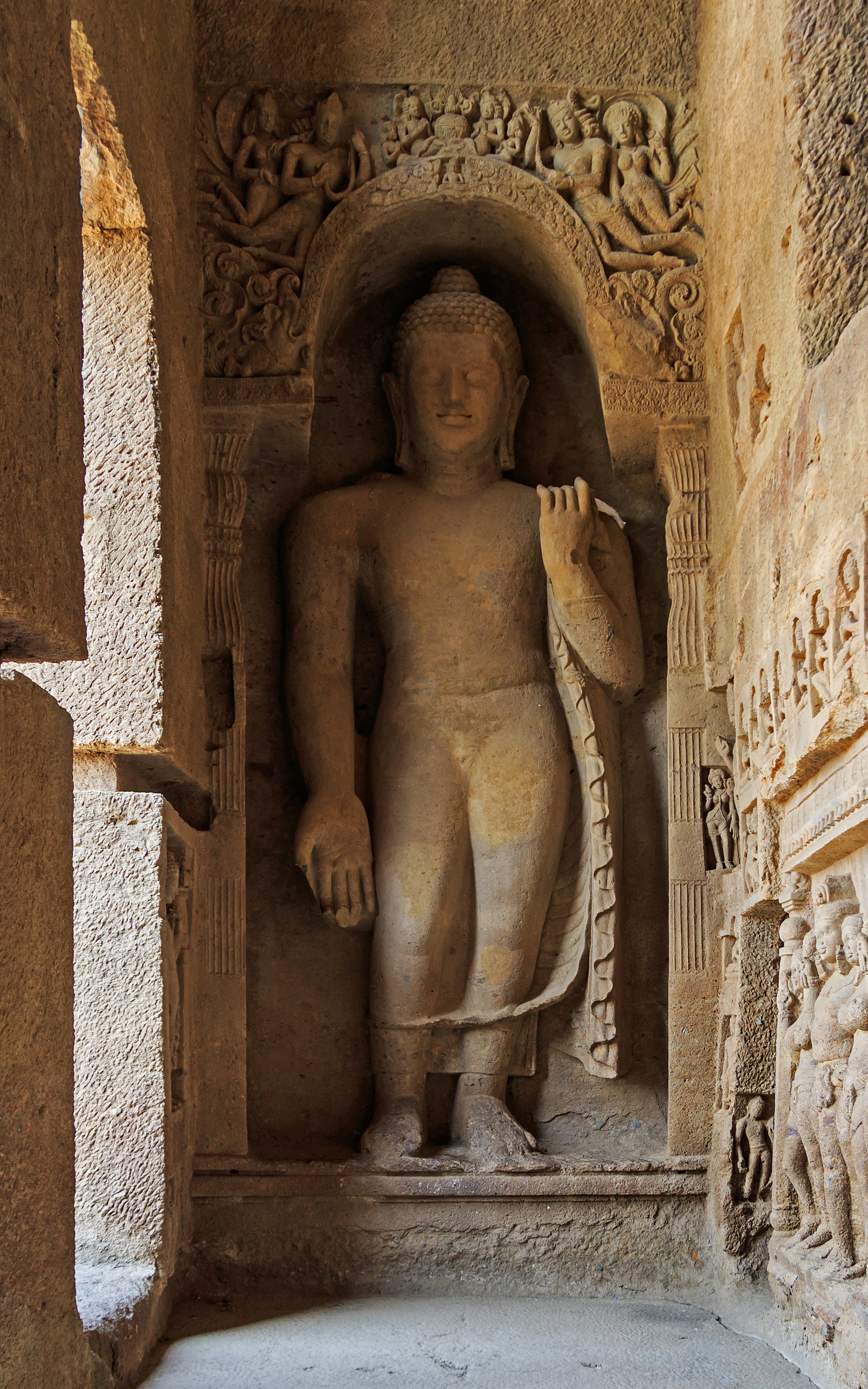
Buddha statue at the entrance.

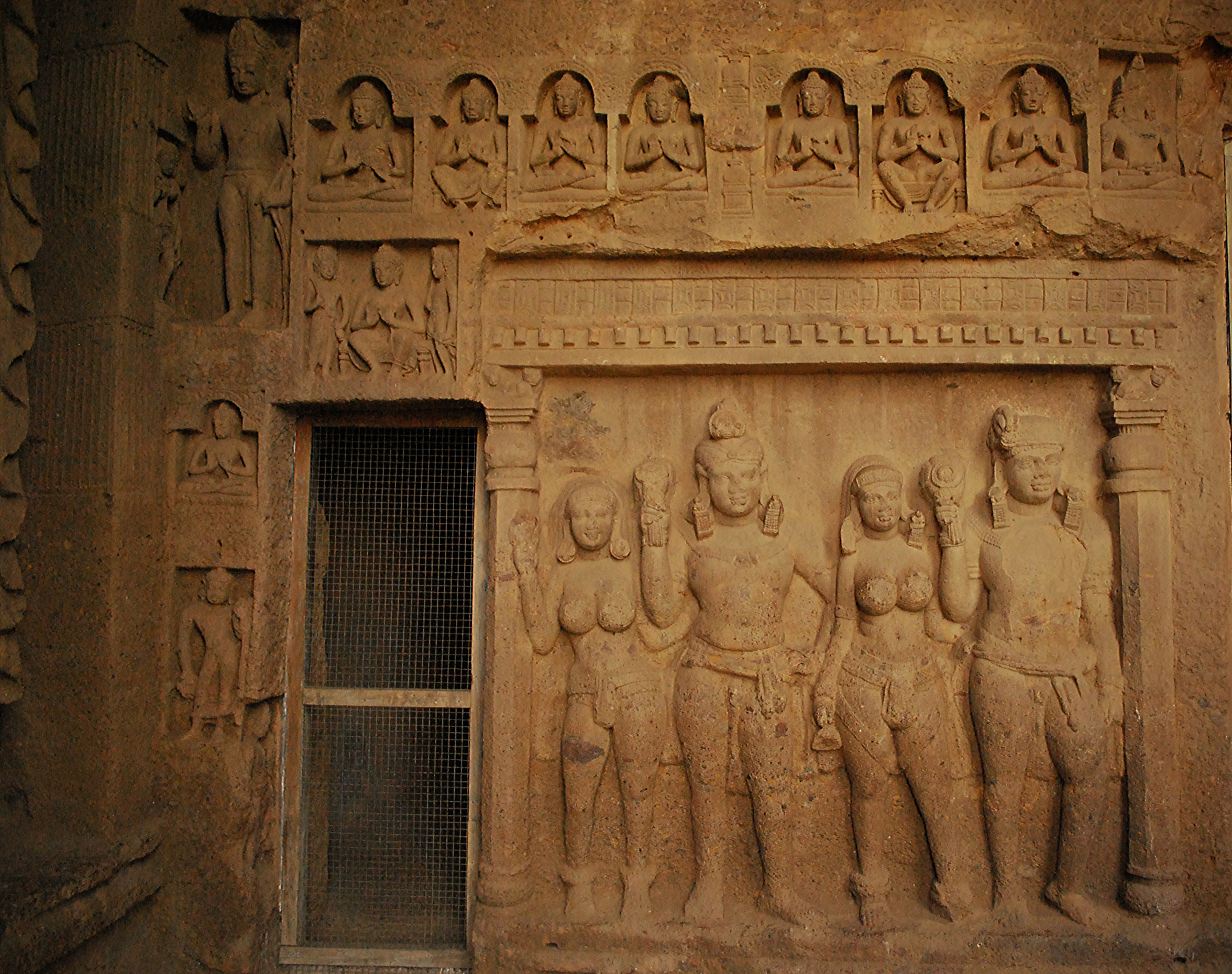
Sculptures in the Great Chaitya (veranda).

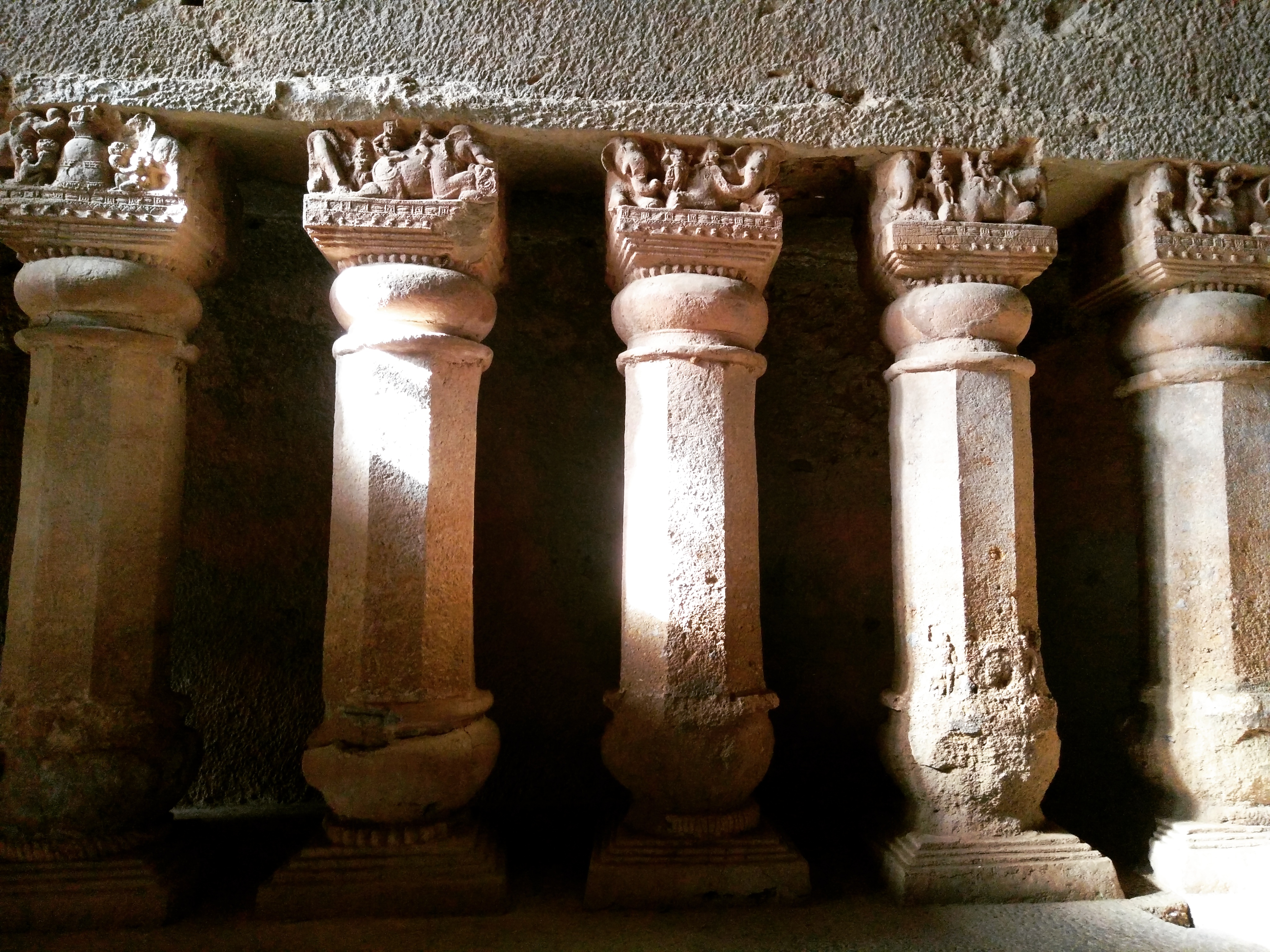
Pillars in the Great Chaitya.
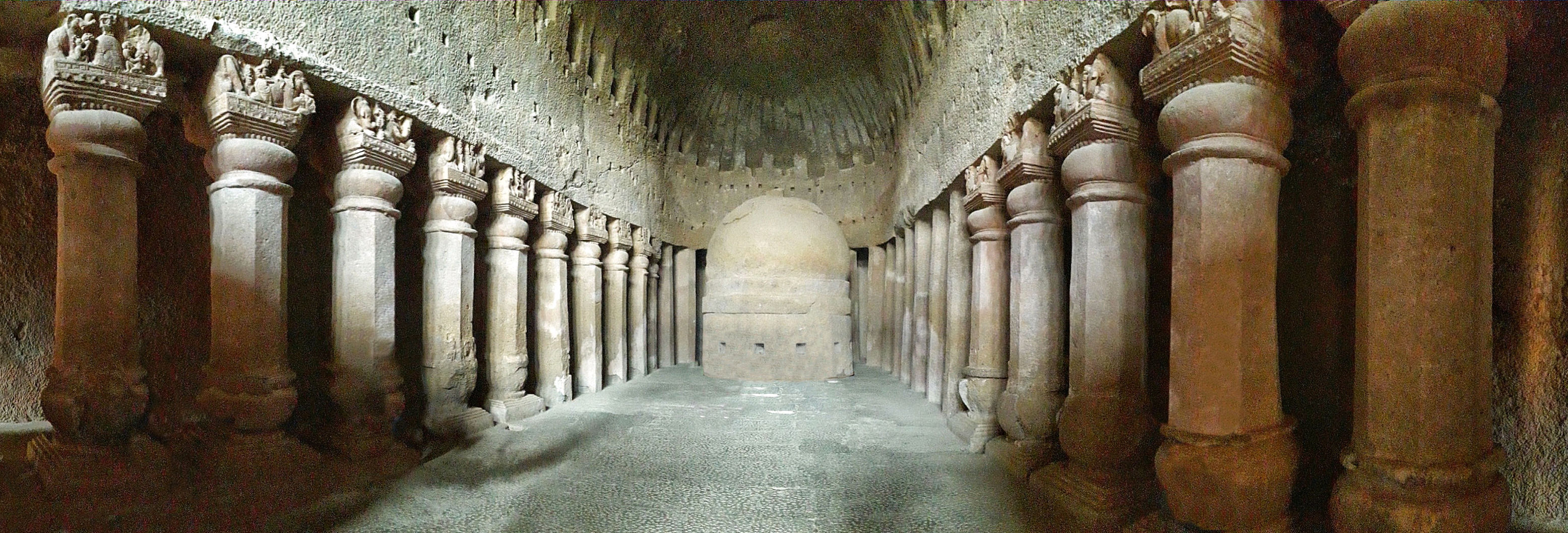
Great Chaitya hall panorama. A slightly late imitation of the Great Chaitya at Karla Caves.

==== Cave No. 4 ====
On the left of the court of the Great Chaitya is a small circular cell containing a solid dagoba, from its position almost certainly of more ancient date than Cave No. 3. This cave is probably older than the Chaitya cave, but the many fascinating sculptures of a walking or teaching Buddha and a litany carved on the dagoba are of a later date.

Cave No.4
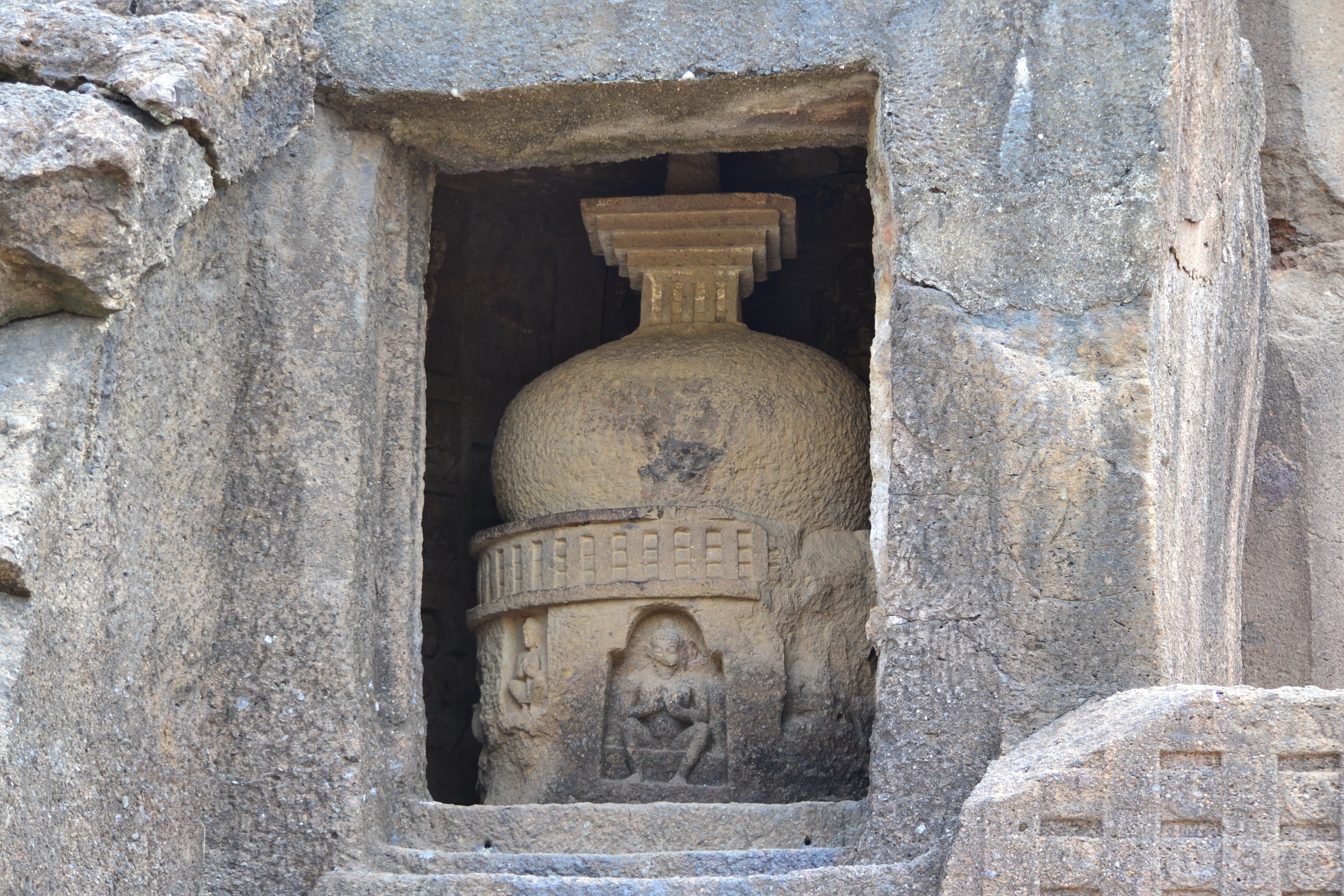
Stupa of cave n°4

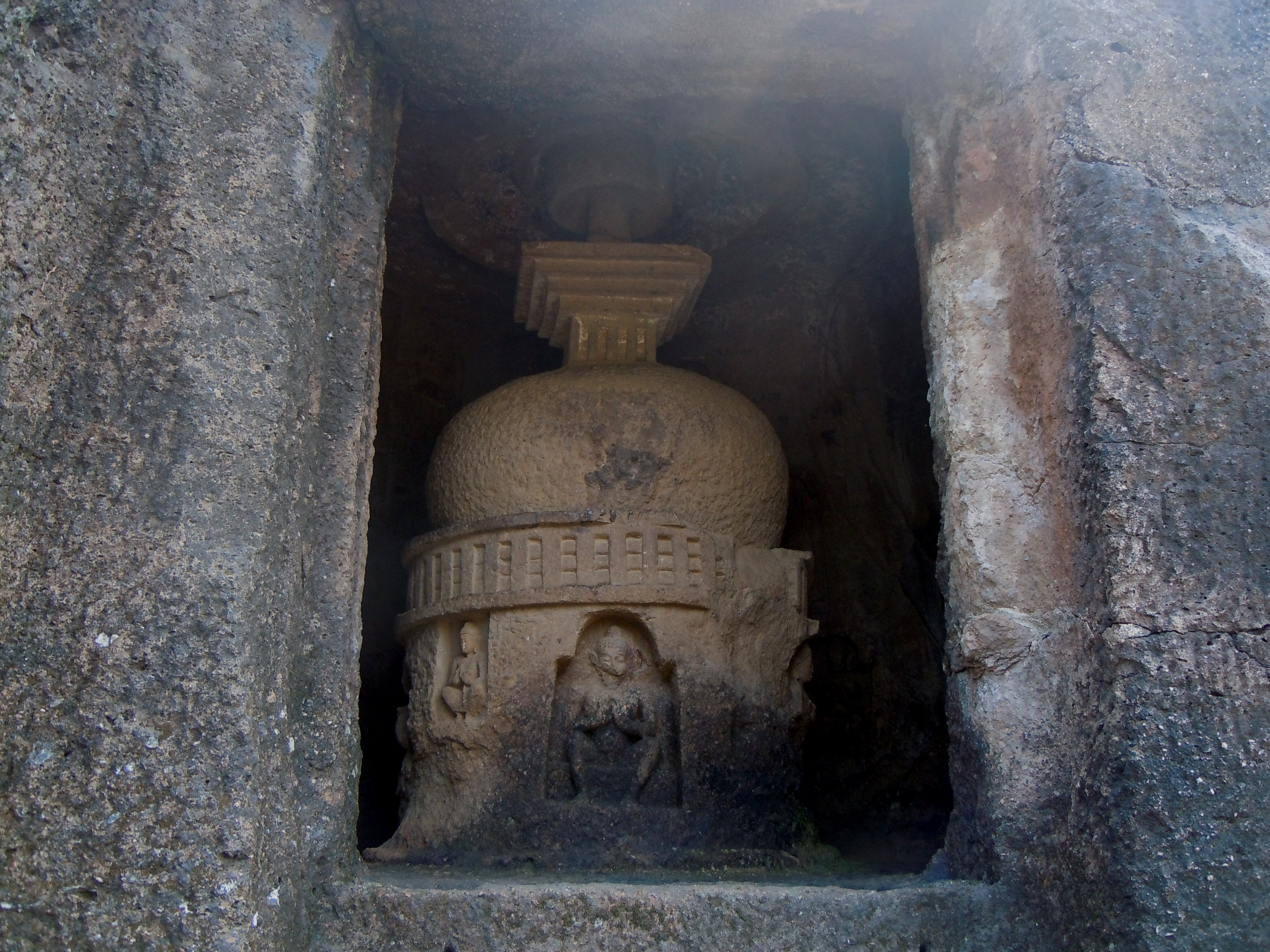

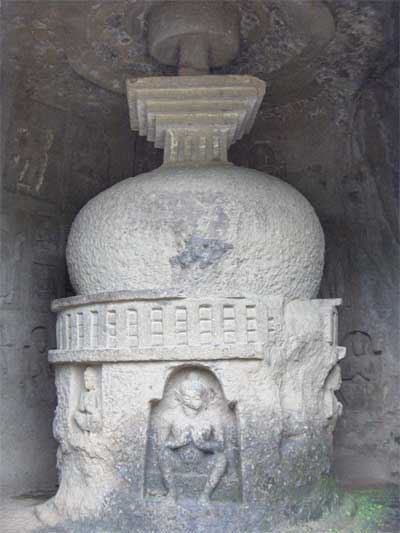

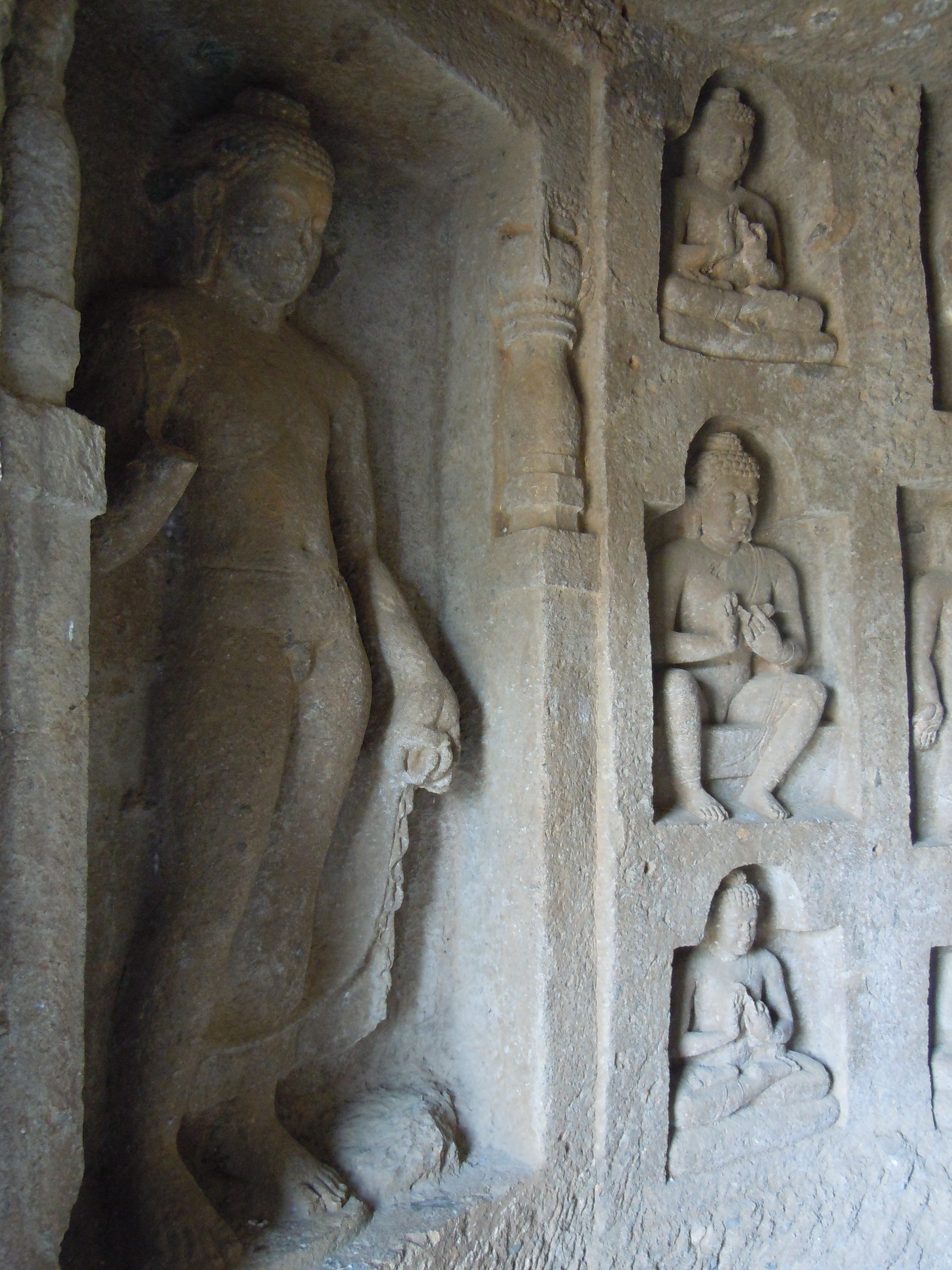

South of Cave No. 4 is another chaitya cave, but quite unfinished and of a much later style of architecture. The veranda columns have square bases and compressed, cushion-shaped capitals of the type found in the Elephanta Caves. The interior was barely begun. It is probably the last excavation of any importance attempted on the hill, and may date to about the ninth or tenth century CE.

=== Cave No. 5 and Cave No. 6 ===
These are not really caves but actually water cisterns. There is an important inscription over these (No. 16 of Gokhale) mentioning that these were donated by a minister named Sateraka. The inscription also mentions the queen of Vashishtiputra Satakarni (130-160 CE), as descending from the race of the Karddamaka dynasty of the Western Satraps, and being the daughter to the Western Satrap ruler Rudradaman.

"Of the queen ... of the illustrious Satakarni Vasishthiputra, descended from the race of Karddamaka kings, (and) daughter of the Mahakshatrapa Ru(dra)....... .........of the confidential minister Sateraka, a water-cistern, the meritorious gift."

— Kanheri inscription of Rudradaman I's daughter.

=== Darbar Cave (Cave No. 11) ===
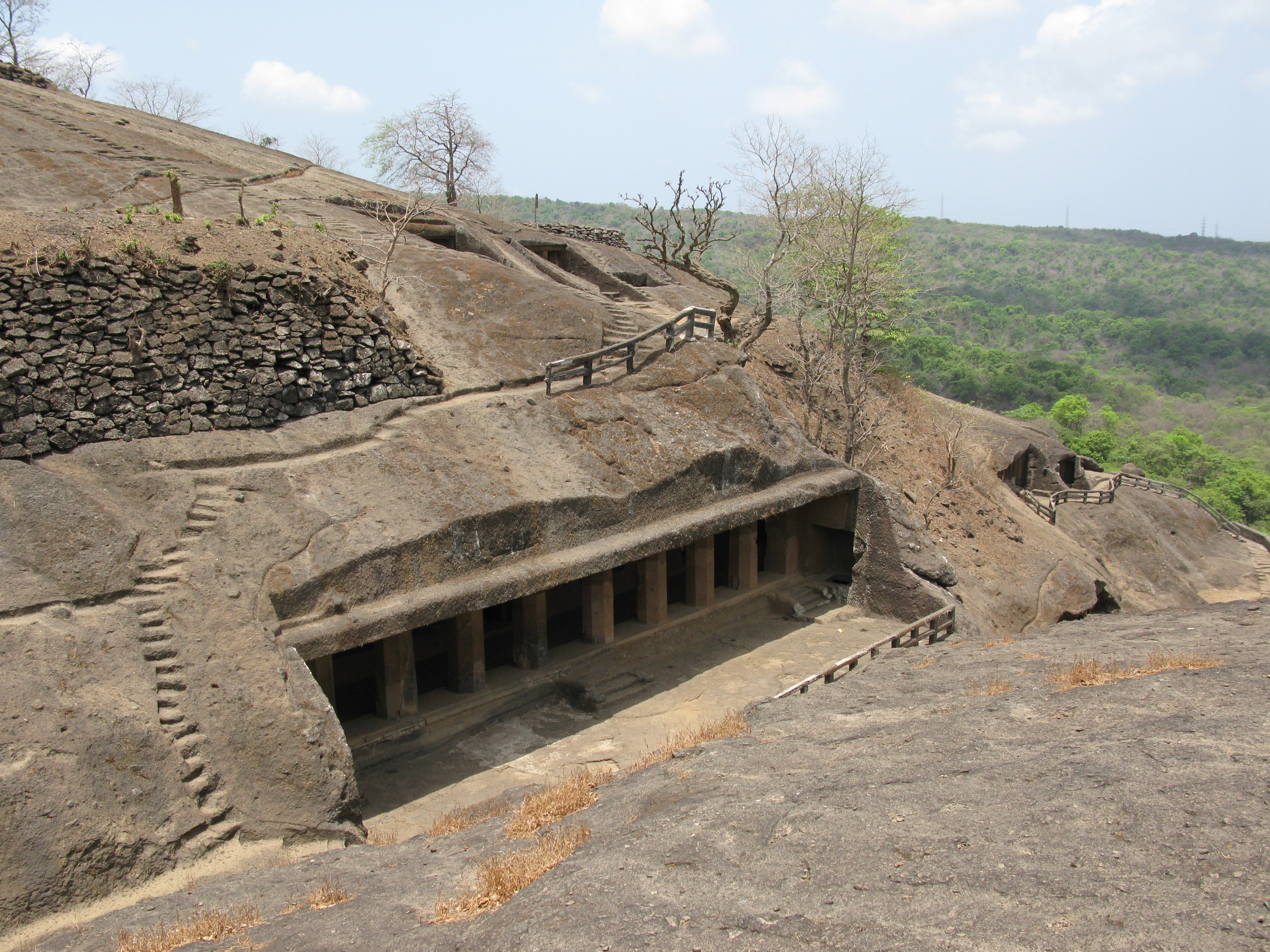
Darbar cave exterior.

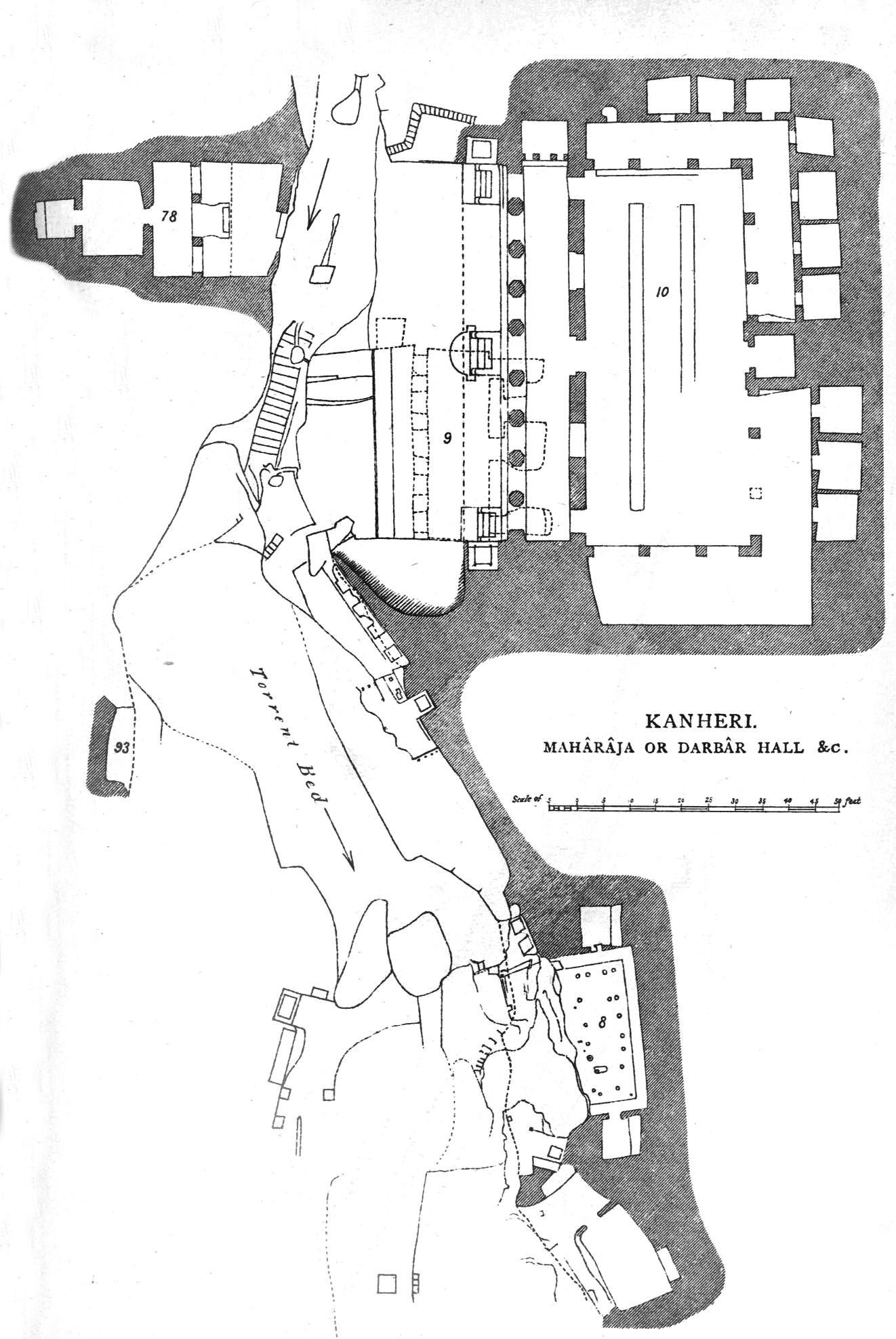
Darbar cave plan.

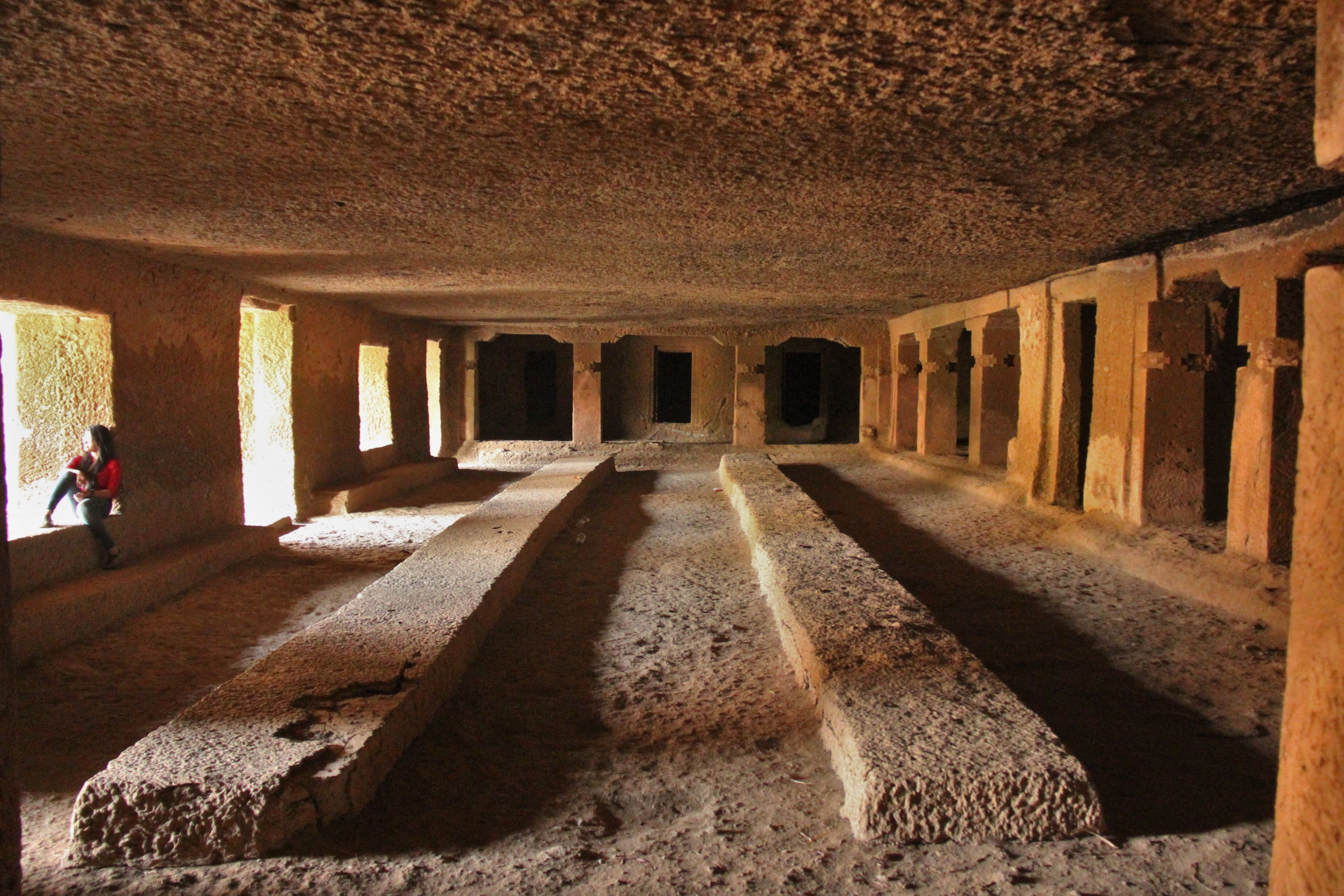
The dining hall.

To the north-east of the Great Chaitya cave, in a gully formed by a torrent, is a cave bearing the name of the Maharaja or Darbar Cave, which is the largest of the class in the group, and, after the Chaitya Caves, certainly the most interesting. It is not a vihara in the ordinary sense of the term, though it has some cells, but a Dharmasala or place of assembly. It is the only cave known to exist that enables us to realise the arrangements of the great hall erected by Ajatashatru in front of the Sattapanni Cave at Rajagriha, to accommodate the first convocation held immediately after the death of the Buddha. According to the Mahavamsa, "Having in all respects perfected this hall, he had invaluable carpets spread there, corresponding to the number of priests (500), in order that being seated on the north side the south might be faced; the inestimable pre-eminent throne of the high priest was placed there. In the centre of the hall, facing the east, the exalted preaching pulpit, fit for the deity himself, was erected."

The plan of the cave shows that the projecting shrine occupies precisely the position of the throne as stated in the above description. In the cave it is occupied by a figure of the Buddha on a simhasana (Lion Throne), with Padmapani and another attendant or chauri-bearers. This plan is what might be expected more than 1,000 years after the First Convocation was held, when the devotion to iconic images of the Buddha had taken the place of the aniconic (or "purer") forms that originally prevailed. It is easy to understand that in the sixth century, when this cave probably was excavated, the "present deity" would be considered the sanctifying force of any assembly, and his human representative would take his seat in front of the image.

In the lower part of the hall, where there are no cells, is a plain space, admirably suited for the pulpit of the priest who read suttas ("bana") to the assembly. The center of the hall, 73 feet by 32 feet, would accommodate from 450 to 500 persons, but evidently was intended for a much smaller congregation. Only two stone benches are provided, and they would hardly hold 100 persons, but be this as it may, it seems quite evident that this cave is not a vihara in the ordinary sense of the term, but a dharmasala or place of assembly like the Nagarjuni Cave.

There is some confusion here between the north and south sides of the hall, but not in the least affecting the position of the resident deity relative to the preacher. From what we know, it seems, as might be expected, the Mahavamsa is correct. The entrance to the hall would be from the north, and the Resident's throne would naturally face it.

There are two inscriptions in this cave, but neither seems to be integral, if any reliance can be placed on the architectural features, though the whole cave is so plain and unornamented that this testimony is not very distinct. The pillars of the veranda are plain octagons without base or capital, and may be of any age. Internally the pillars are square above and below, with incised circular mouldings, changing in the center into a belt with 16 sides or flutes, and with plain bracket capitals. Their style is that of the Viswakarma temple at Ellora, and even more distinctly that of the Chaori in the Mokundra pass. A Gupta Empire inscription has lately been found in this last, limiting its date to the fifth century, which is probably that of the Yiswakarma Cave, so that this cave can hardly be much more modern. The age, however, of this cave is not so important as its use. It seems to throw a new light on the arrangements in many Buddhist Caves, whose appropriation has hitherto been difficult to understand.

=== Other caves ===
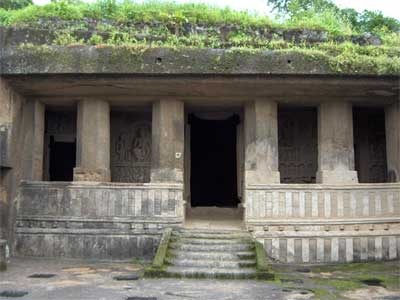
Cave 67, a vihara.

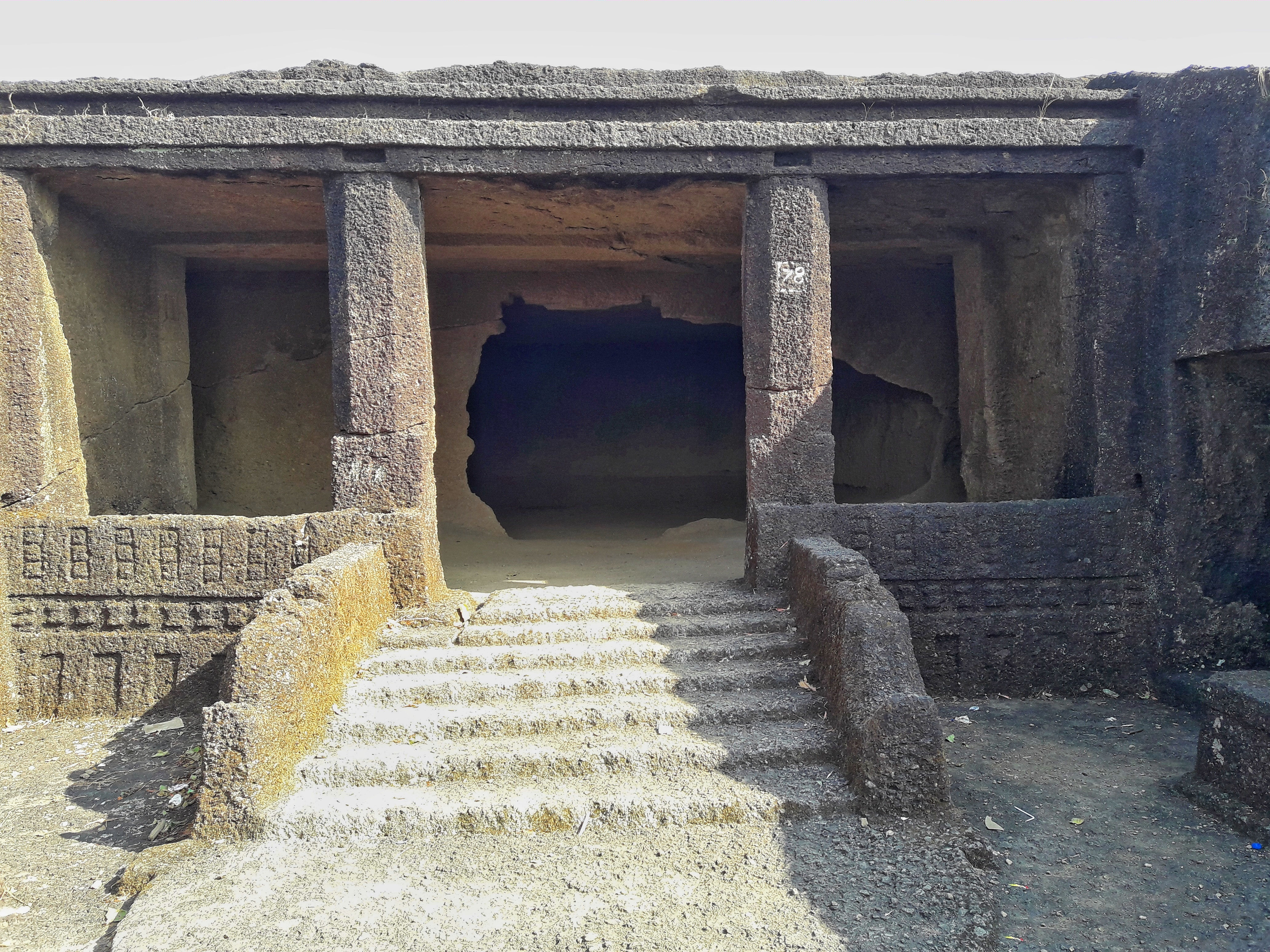
Cave 78. This cave has an inscription of the time of Gautamiputra Satakarni.

Directly opposite Cave No. 11 is a small cave with two pillars and two half ones in the veranda, having an inscription of about the 9th or 10th century on the frieze. Inside is a small hall with a rough cell at the back, containing only an image of the Buddha on the back wall.

The next cave, No. 78 on the south side of the ravine, is also probably of comparatively late age. It has two massive square pillars in the verandah, with necks cut into sixteen flutes as in the Darbar cave and some of the Ellora Buddhist caves, it consequently is probably of the same age. The hall is small with a room to the right of it, and in the large shrine at the back is a well cut dagoba.

The next consists of a small hall, lighted by the door and a small latticed window, with a bench running along the left side and back and a cell on the right with a stone bed in it. The veranda has had a low screen wall connecting its two octagon pillars with the ends. Outside, on the left, is a large recess and over it two long inscriptions. Close to this is another cave with four benched chambers; possibly it originally consisted of three small caves, of which the dividing partitions have been destroyed; but till 1853 the middle one contained the ruins of four small dagobas, built of unbumt bricks. These were excavated by Edward William West, and led to the discovery of a very large number of seal impressions in dried clay, many of them enclosed in clay receptacles, the upper halves of which were neatly molded somewhat in the form of dagobas, and with them were found other pieces of molded clay which probably formed chhatris for the tops of them, making the resemblance complete.

Close to the dagobas two small stone pots were also found containing ashes and five copper coins apparently of the Bahmani dynasty, and if so, of the 14th or 15th century. The characters on the seal impressions are of a much earlier age, but probably not before the 10th century, and most of them contain merely the Buddha creed.

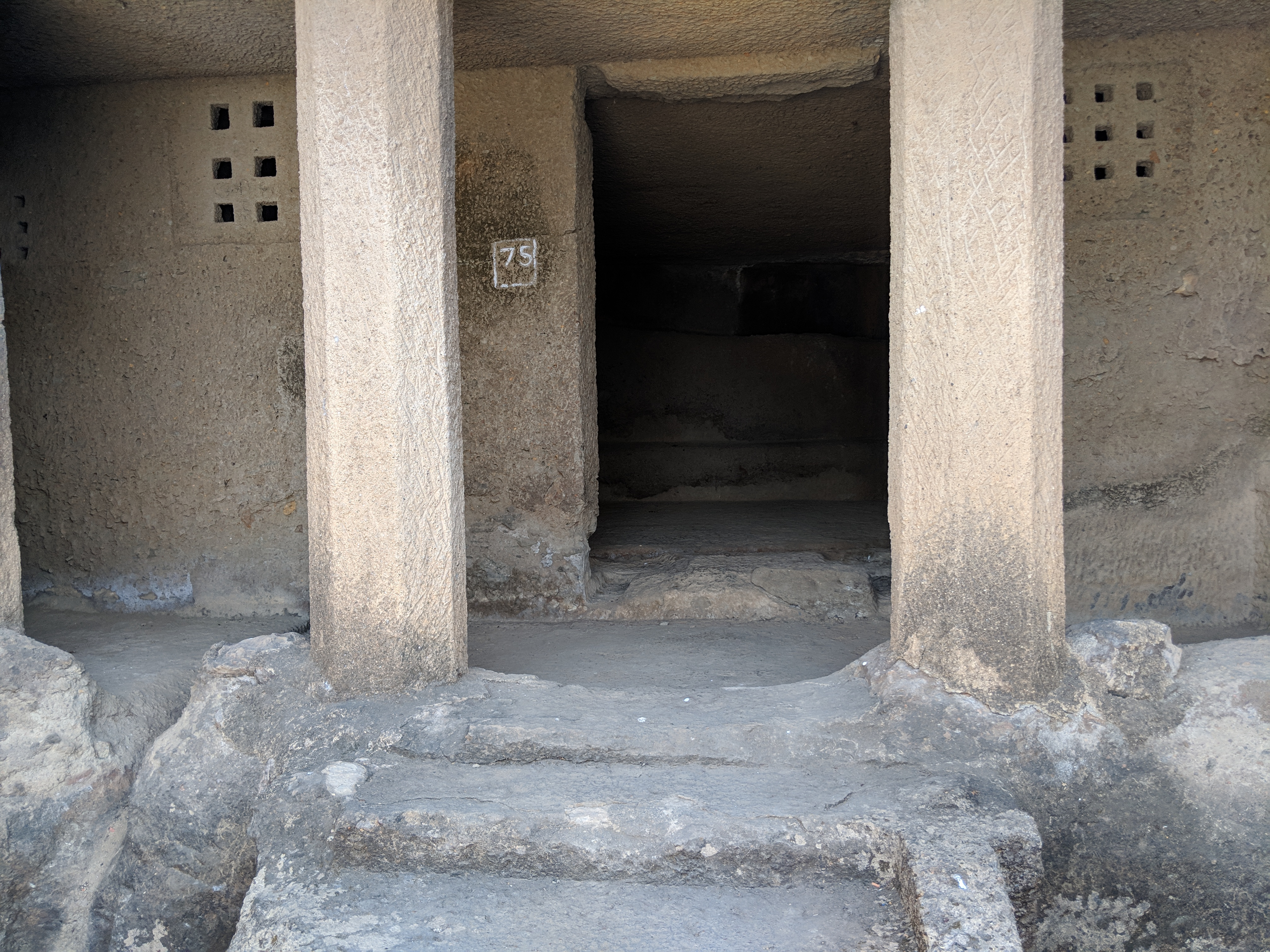
Entrance to cave 75

The next cave on the same side has a pretty large hall with a bench at each side, two slender square columns and pilasters in front of the antechamber, the inner walls of which are sculptured with four tall standing images of Buddha. The shrine is now empty, and whether it contained a structural simhasana or a dagoba is difficult to say.

Upon the opposite side of the gulley is an immense excavation so ruined by the decay of the rock as to look much like a natural cavern; it has had a very long hall, of which the entire front is gone, a square antechamber with two cells to the left and three to the right of it. The inner shrine is empty. In front has been a brick dagoba rifled long ago, and at the west end are several fragments of caves; the fronts and dividing walls of all are gone.

==== Cave 41 ====
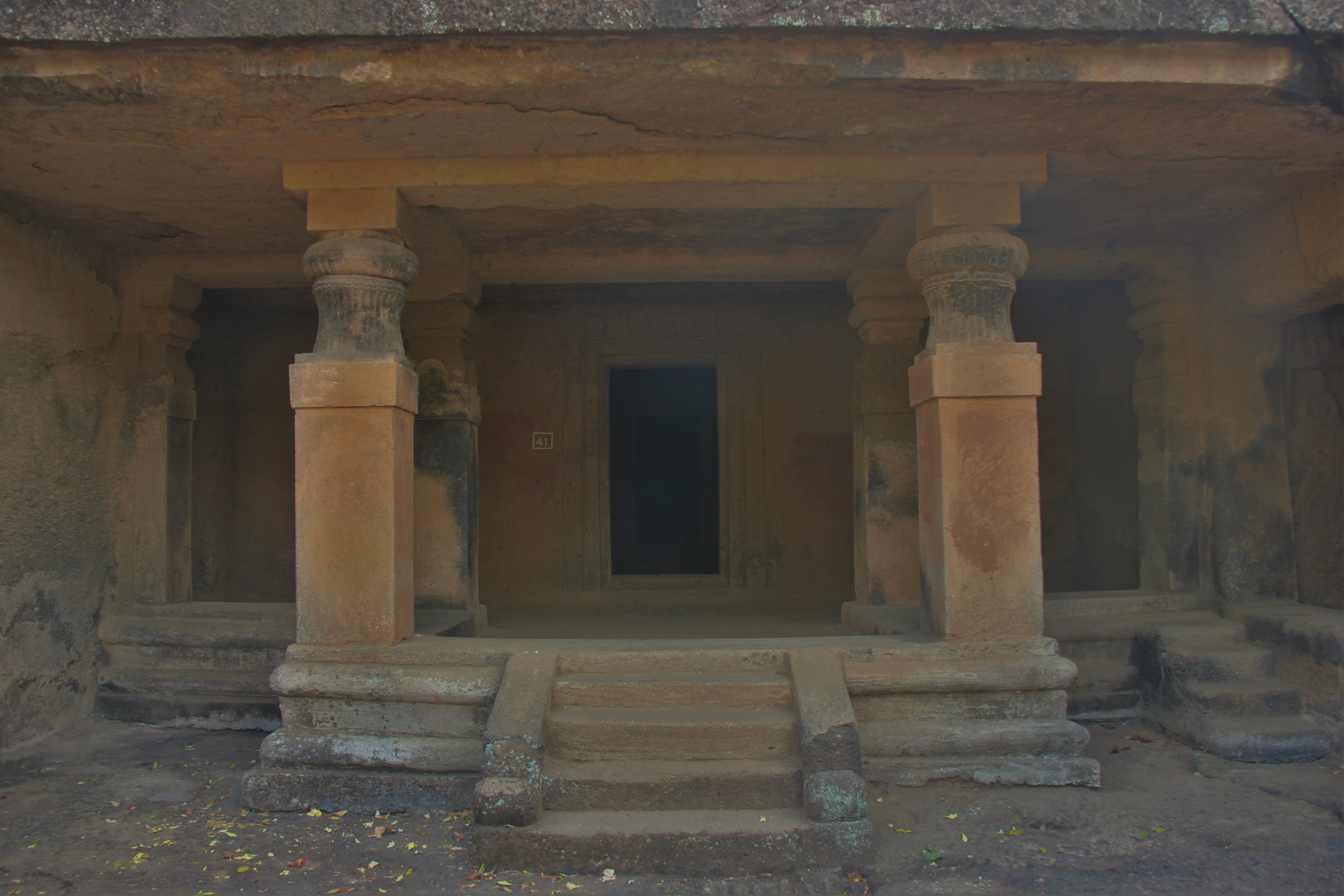
Cave 41.

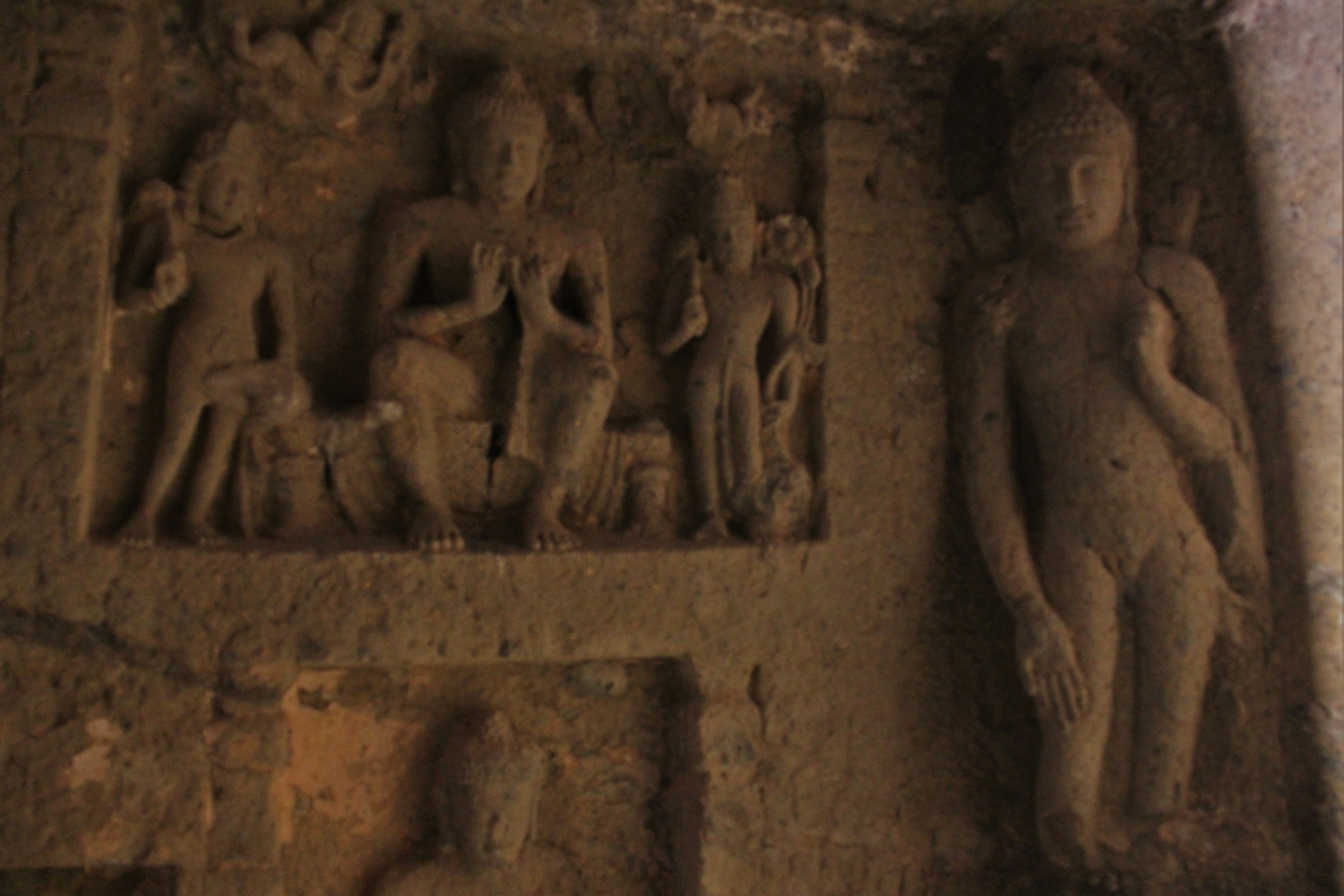
Sculptures of Cave 41.

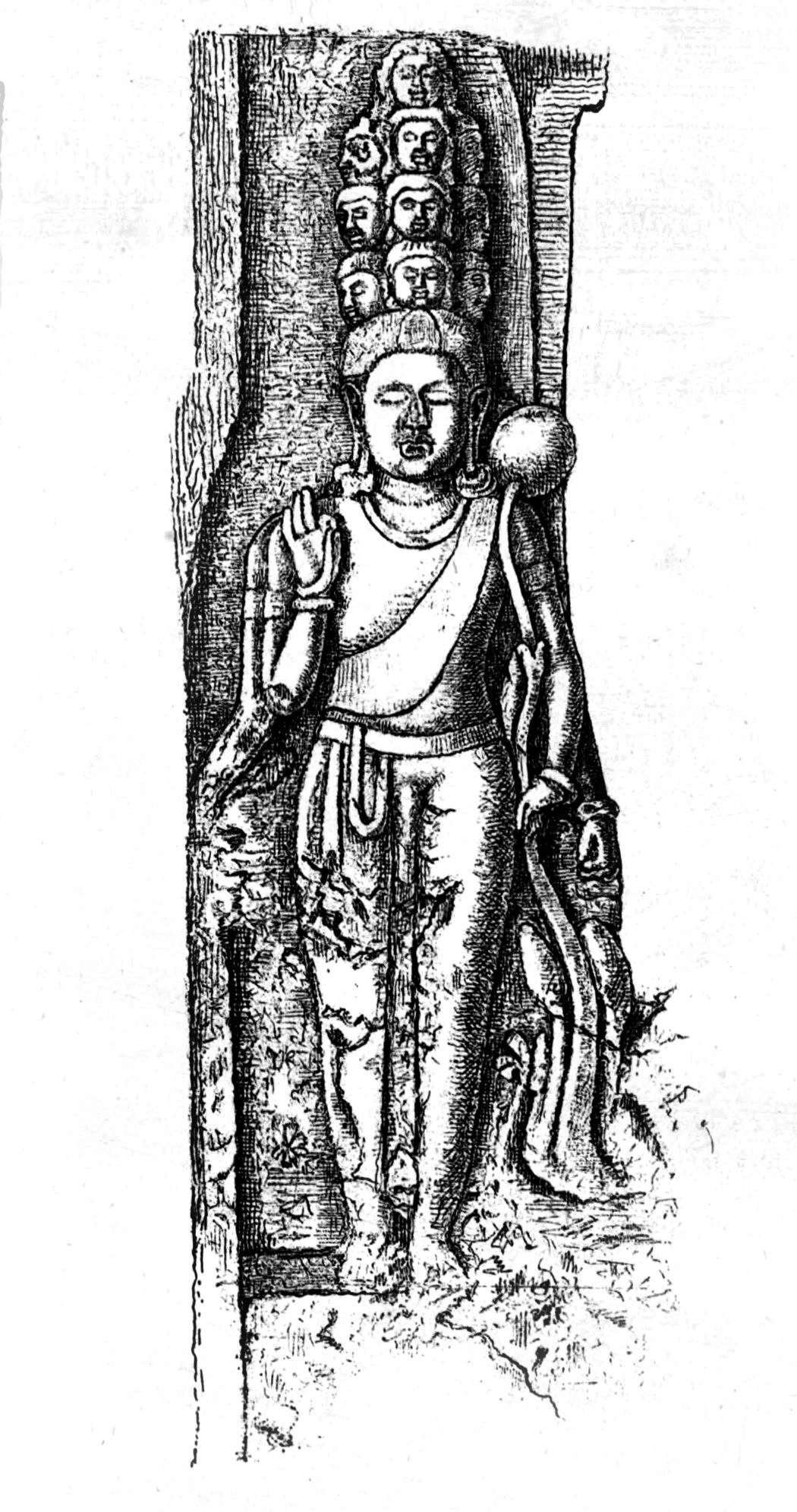
Kanheri Caves, Eleven-faced Ekādaśamukha (Cave 41)

Some way farther up is a vihara with a large advanced porch supported by pillars of the Elephanta Caves type in front and by square ones behind of the pattern occurring in Cave 15 at Ajanta. The hall door is surrounded by mouldings, and on the back wall are the remains of painting, consisting of Buddhas. In the shrine is an image, and small ones are cut in the side walls, in which are also two cells. In a large recess to the right of the porch is a seated figure of Buddha, and on his left is Padmapani or Sahasrabahu-lokeswara, with ten additional heads piled up over his own; and on the other side of the chamber is the litany with four compartments on each side. This is evidently a late cave.

==== More caves ====
Altogether there are upwards of 30 excavations on both sides of this ravine, and nearly opposite the last-mentioned is a broken dam, which has confined the water above, forming a lake. On the hill to the north, just above this, is a ruined temple, and near it the remains of several stupas and dagobas. Just above the ravine, on the south side, is a range of about nineteen caves, the largest of which is a fine vihara cave, with cells in the side walls. It has four octagonal pillars in the veranda connected by a low screen wall and seat, and the walls of the veranda, and sides and back of the hall, are covered with sculptured figures of Buddha in different attitudes and variously accompanied, but with so many female figures introduced as to show that it was the work of the Mahayana school. There is reason, however, to suppose that the sculpture is later than the excavation of the cave.

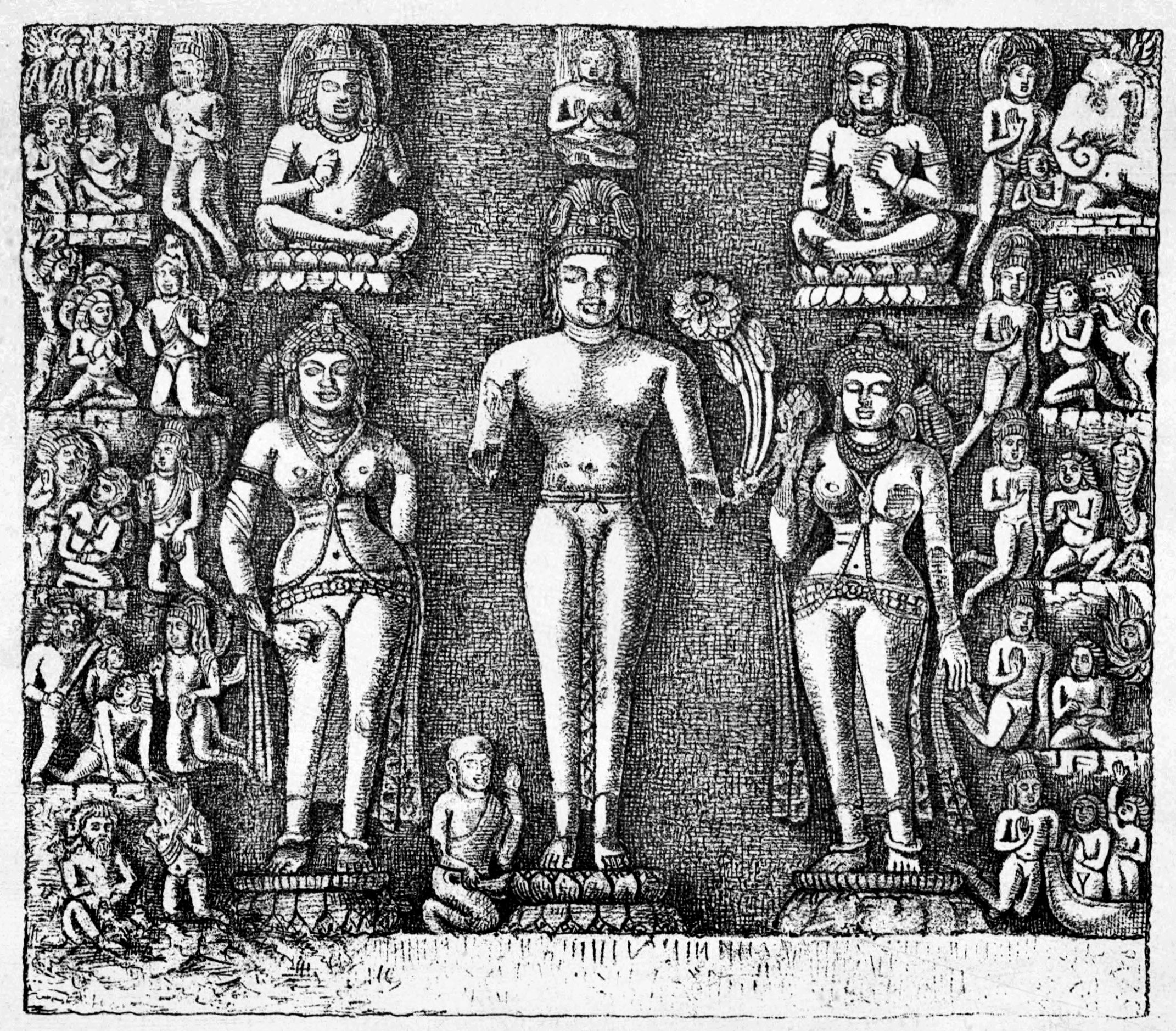
Kanheri cave 90 sculptures depicting Avalokitesvara, Tara and Bhrkuti.

Behind and above these is another range, in some parts double, three near the east end being remarkable for the profusion of their sculptures, consisting chiefly of Buddhas with attendants, dagobas, etc... But in one is a fine sculptured litany, in which the central figure of Avalokiteswara has a tall female on each side, and beyond each are five compartments, those on the right representing danger from the elephant, lion, snake, fire, and shipwreck; those on the left from imprisonment (?) Garuda, Shitala or disease, sword, and some enemy not now recognizable from the abrasion of the stone.

==== Cave No.90 ====
In Cave No.90 is a similar group representing Buddha seated on the Padmasana, on a lotus throne, supported by two figures with snake hoods, and surrounded by attendants in the manner so usual in the Mahayana sculptures of a later age in these caves. There are more figures in this one than are generally found on these compositions, but they are all very like one another in their general characteristics.

Over the cistern and on the pilasters of the veranda are inscriptions which at first sight appear to be in a tabular form and in characters met with nowhere else; they are in Pahlavi.

Cave No.90
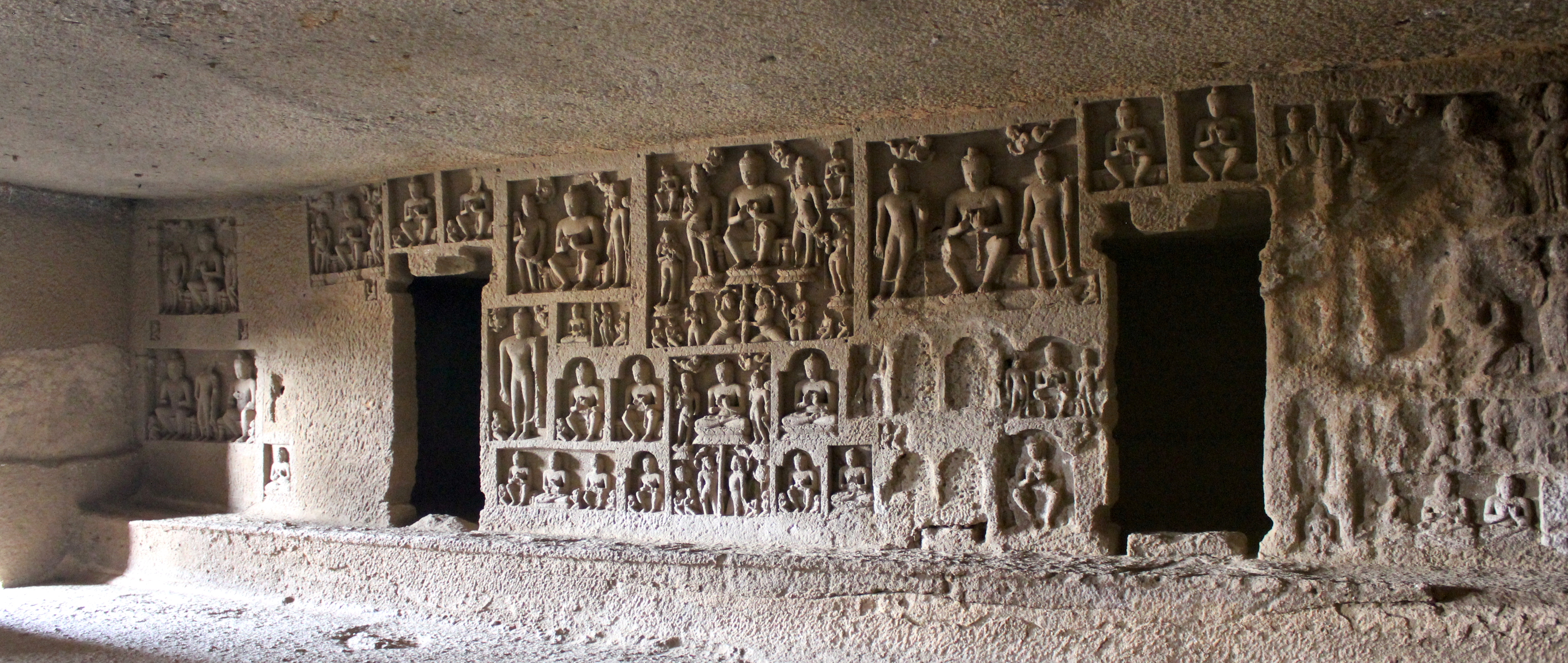
Cave 90, sculptures of the left wall.

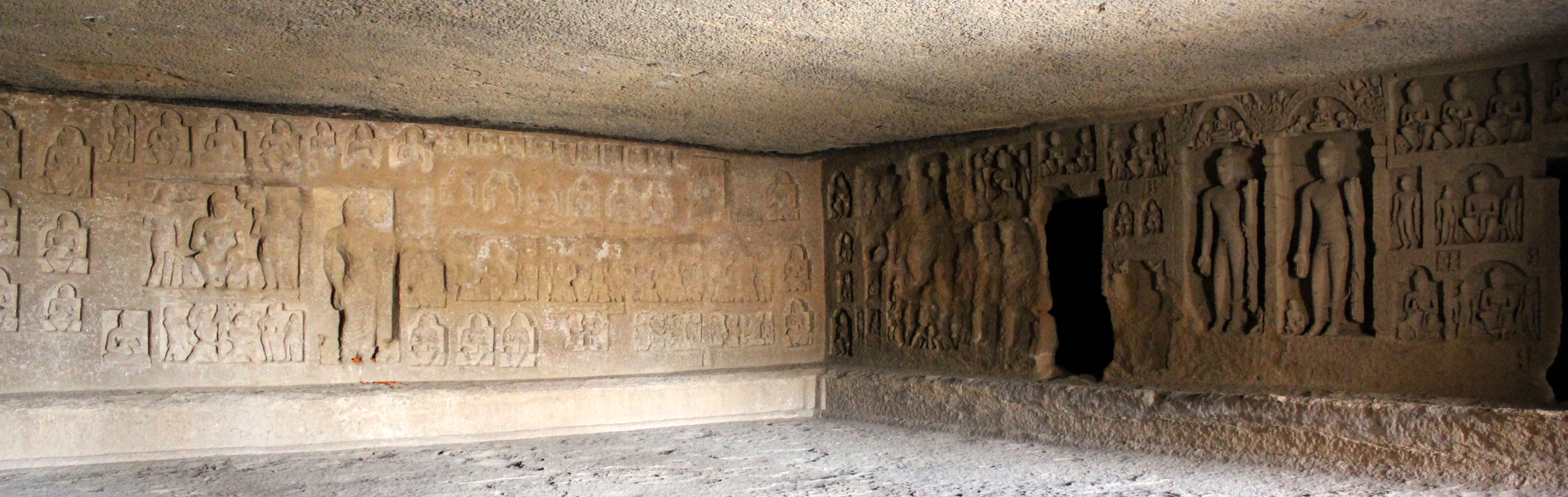
Cave 90, sculptures of the back and right walls.

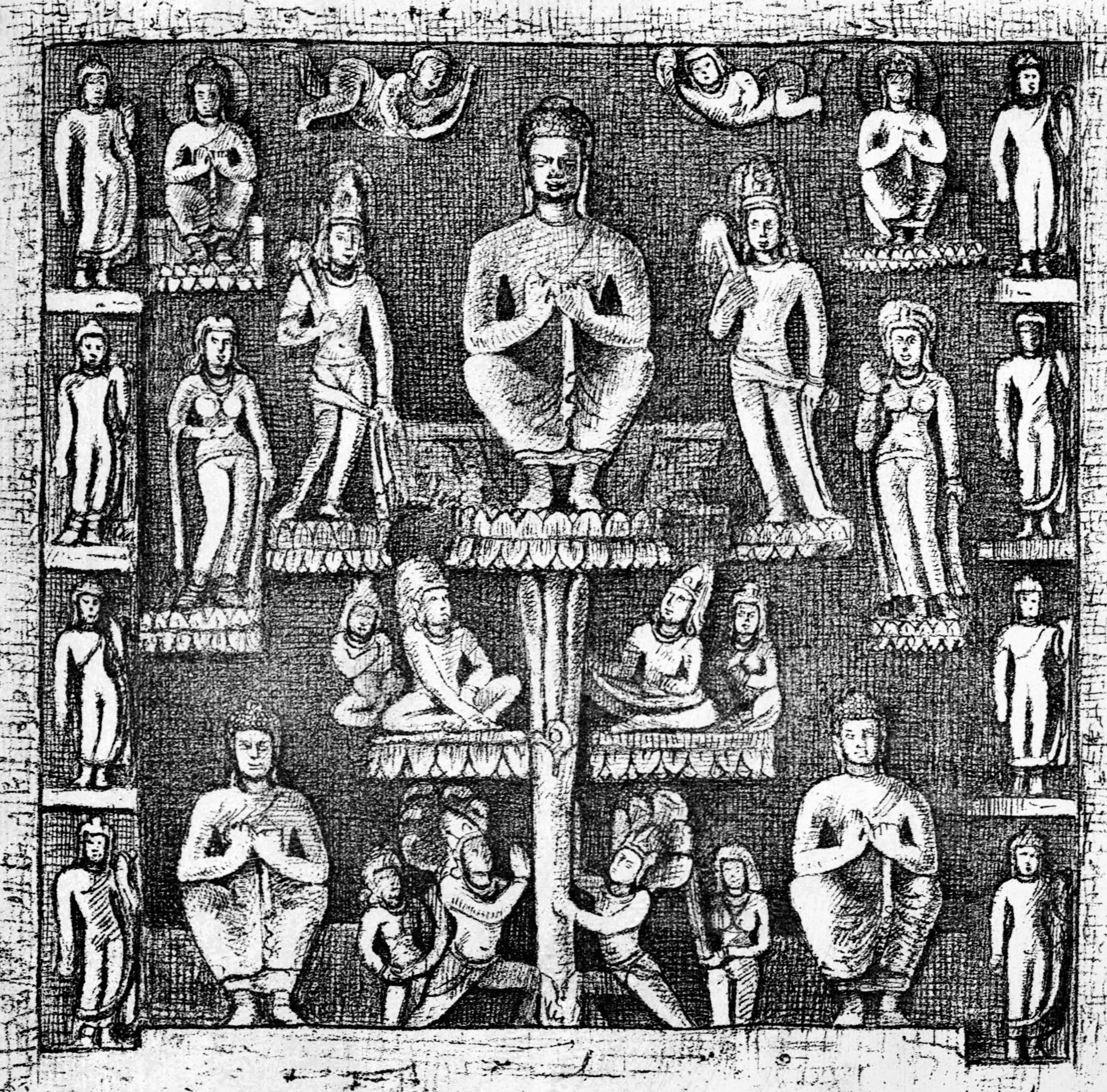
The Buddha in Padmasana with attendants, Cave 90.

Lastly, from a point near the west end of this last range, a series of nine excavations trend to the south, but are no way remarkable.

What strikes every visitor to these Kanheri caves is the number of water cisterns, most of the caves being furnished with its own cistern at the side of the front court, and these being filled all the year round with pure water. In front of many of the caves too there are holes in the floor of the court, and over their facades are mortices cut in the rock as footings for posts, and holdings for wooden rafters to support a covering to shelter the front of the caves during the monsoon.

All over the hill from one set of caves to another steps are cut on the surface of the rock, and these stairs in many cases have had handrails along the sides of them.

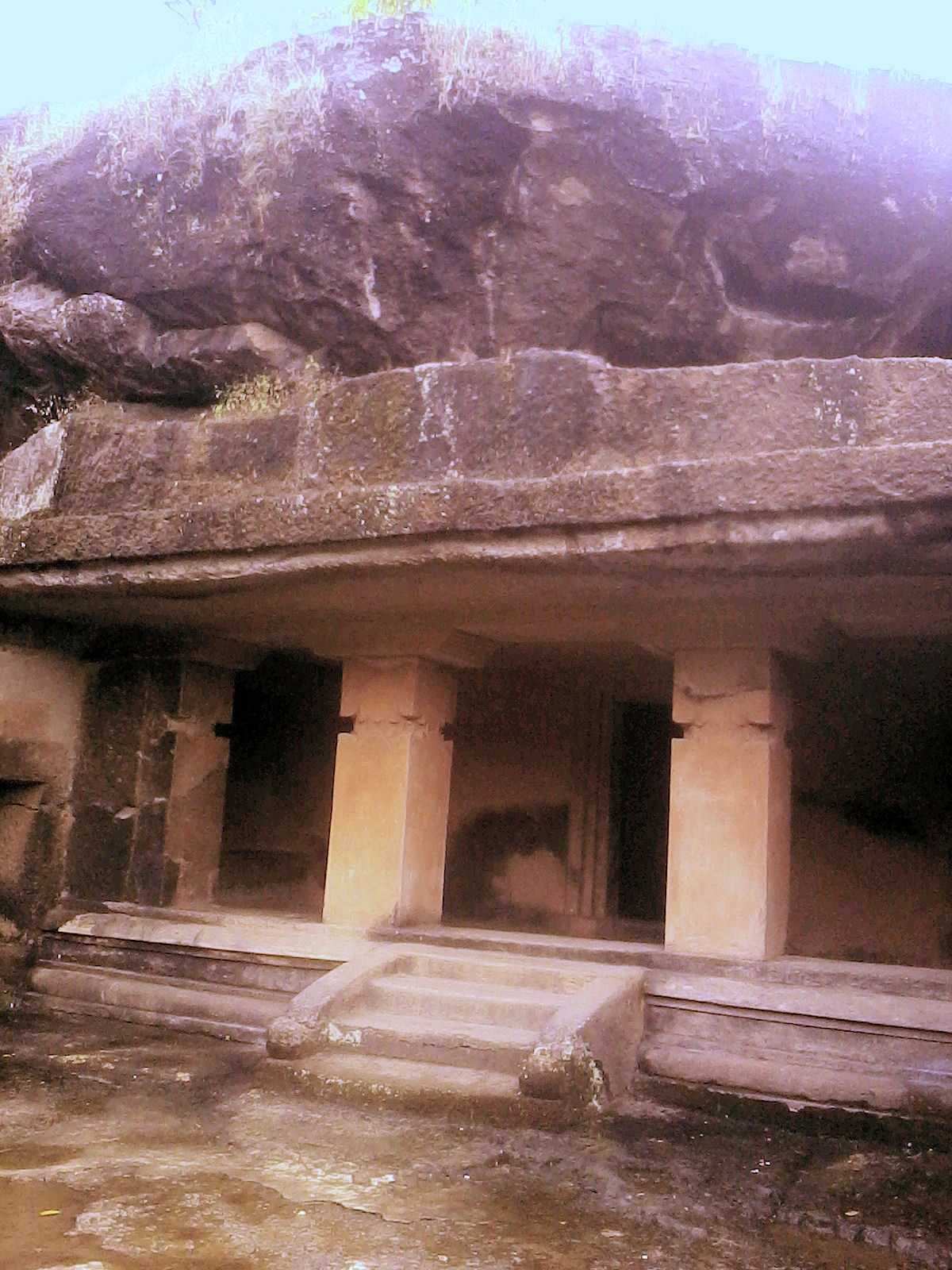
Cave 34.

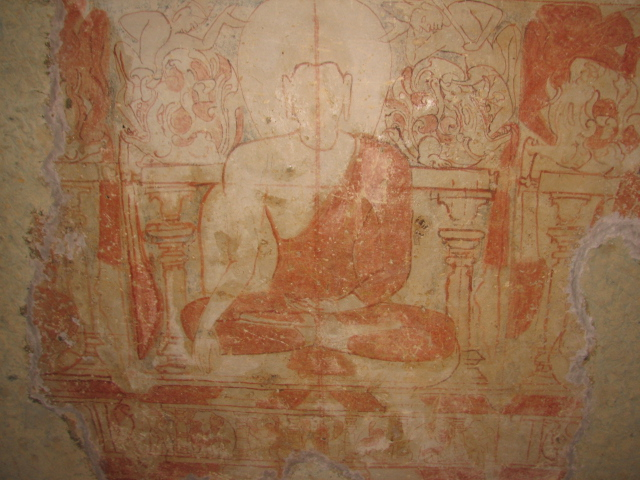
Unfinished painting on ceiling of cave 34.

Passing the last-mentioned group and advancing southwards by an ancient path cut with steps wherever there is a descent, we reach the edge of the cliff and descend it by a ruined stair about 330 yards south of the great Chaitya cave. This lands in a long gallery extending over 200 yards south-south-east, and sheltered by the overhanging rock above. The floor of this gallery is found to consist of the foundations of small brick dagobas buried in dust and debris, and probably sixteen to twenty in number, seven of which were opened out by Mr. Ed. W. West in 1853.' Beyond these is the ruin of a large stone stupa, on which has been a good deal of sculpture, and which was explored and examined by Mr. West. In the rock behind it are three small cells also containing decayed sculptures, with traces of plaster covered with painting. Beyond this the floor suddenly rises about 14 feet, where are the remains of eleven small brick stupas; then another slight ascent lands on a level, on which are thirty-three similar ruined stupas buried in debris. Overhead the rock has been cut out in some places to make room for them. On the back wall are some dagobas in relief and three benched recesses. The brick stupas vary from 4 to 6 feet in diameter at the base, but all are destroyed down to near that level, and seem to have been all rifled, for in none of those examined have any relics been found.

There were other large stupas in front of the great Chaitya cave, but these were opened in 1839 by Dr. James Bird, who thus described his operations "The largest of the topes selected for examination appeared to have been one time between 12 or 16 feet in height. It was much dilapidated, and was penetrated from above to the base, which was built of cut stone. After digging to the level of the ground and clearing away the materials, the workmen came to a circular stone, hollow in the centre, and covered at the top by a piece of gypsum. This contained two small copper urns, in one of which were some ashes mixed with a ruby, a pearl, small pieces of gold, and a small gold box, containing a piece of cloth; in the other a silver box and some ashes were found. Two copper plates containing legible inscriptions, in the Lat or cave character, accompanied the urns, and these, as far as I have yet been able to decipher them, inform us that the persons buried here were of the Buddhist faith. The smaller of the copper plates bears an inscription in two lines, the last part of which contains the Buddhist creed."

On the east side of the hill are many squared stones, foundations, tanks, etc..., all betokening the existence at some period of a large colony of monks.

== Paintings in the caves ==
Cave number 34 has unfinished paintings of Buddha on the ceiling of the cave.

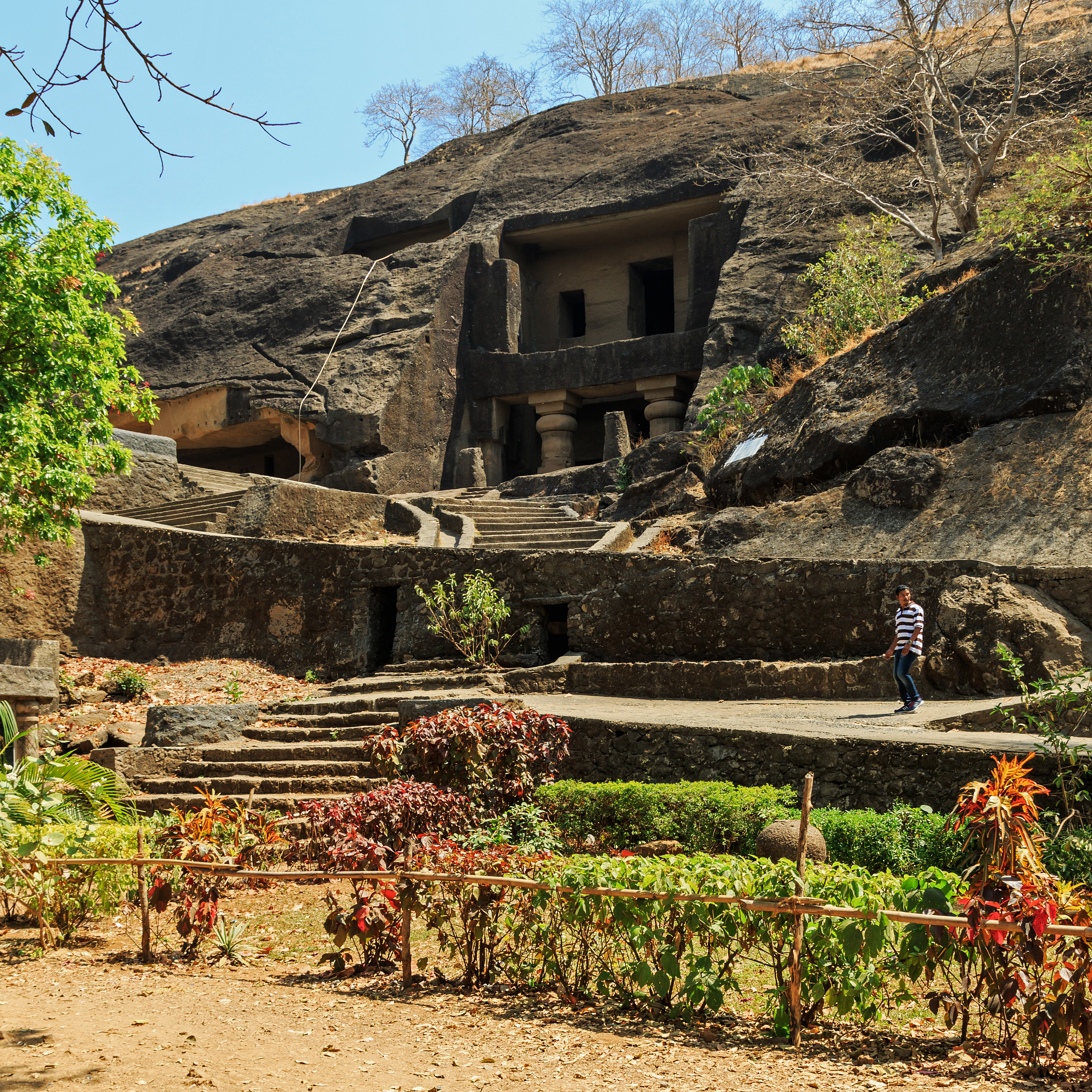
Main entrance to the caves

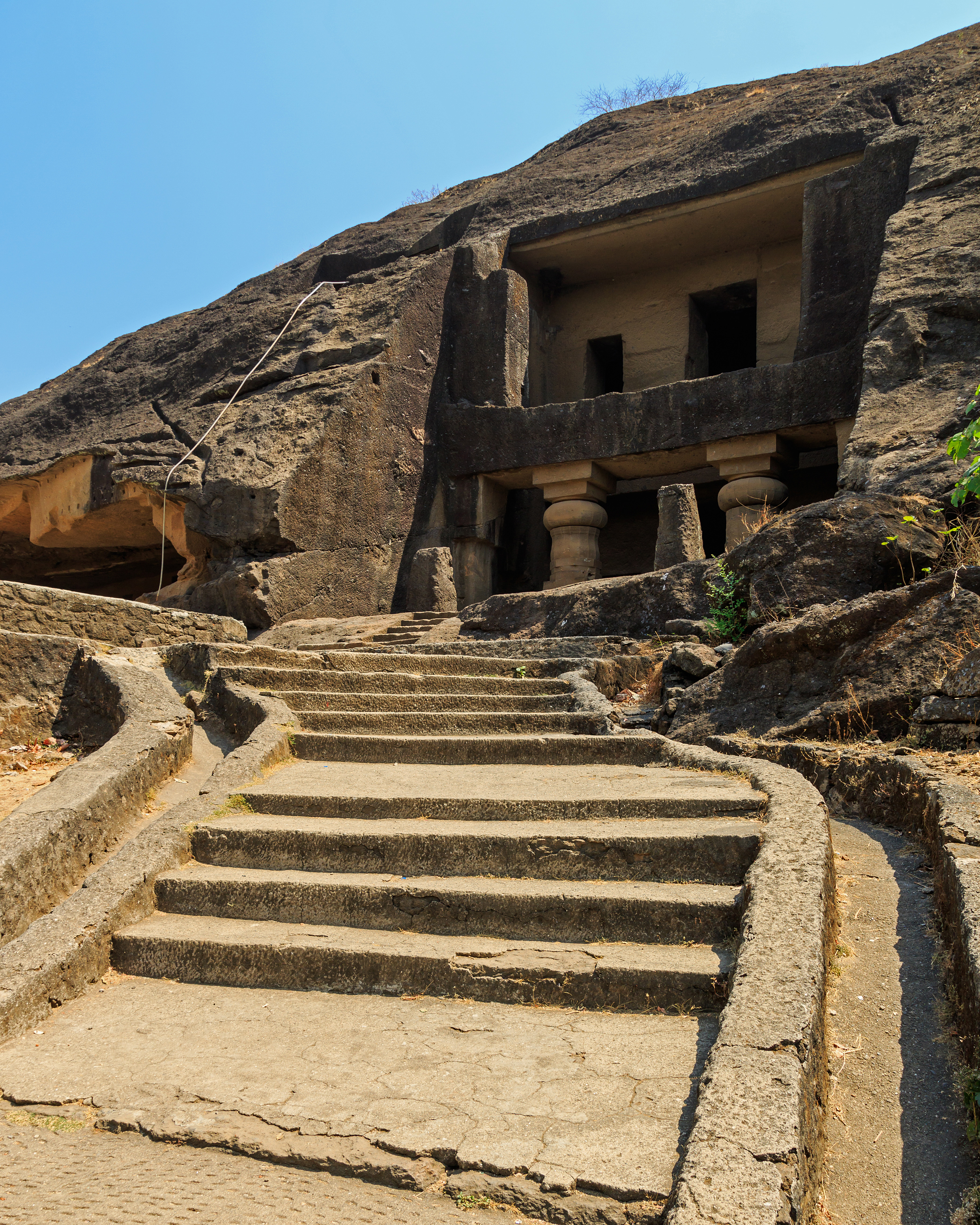
Cave 1

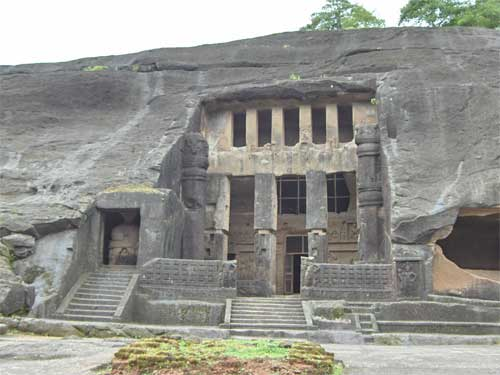
Cave 3

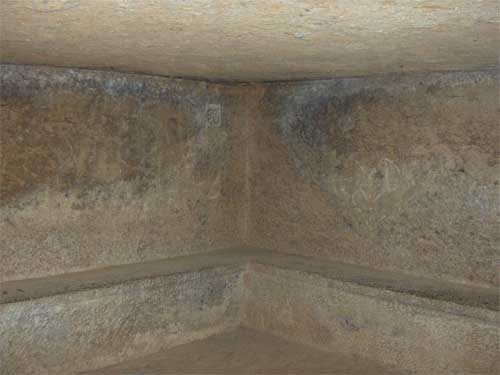
Spartan plinth beds

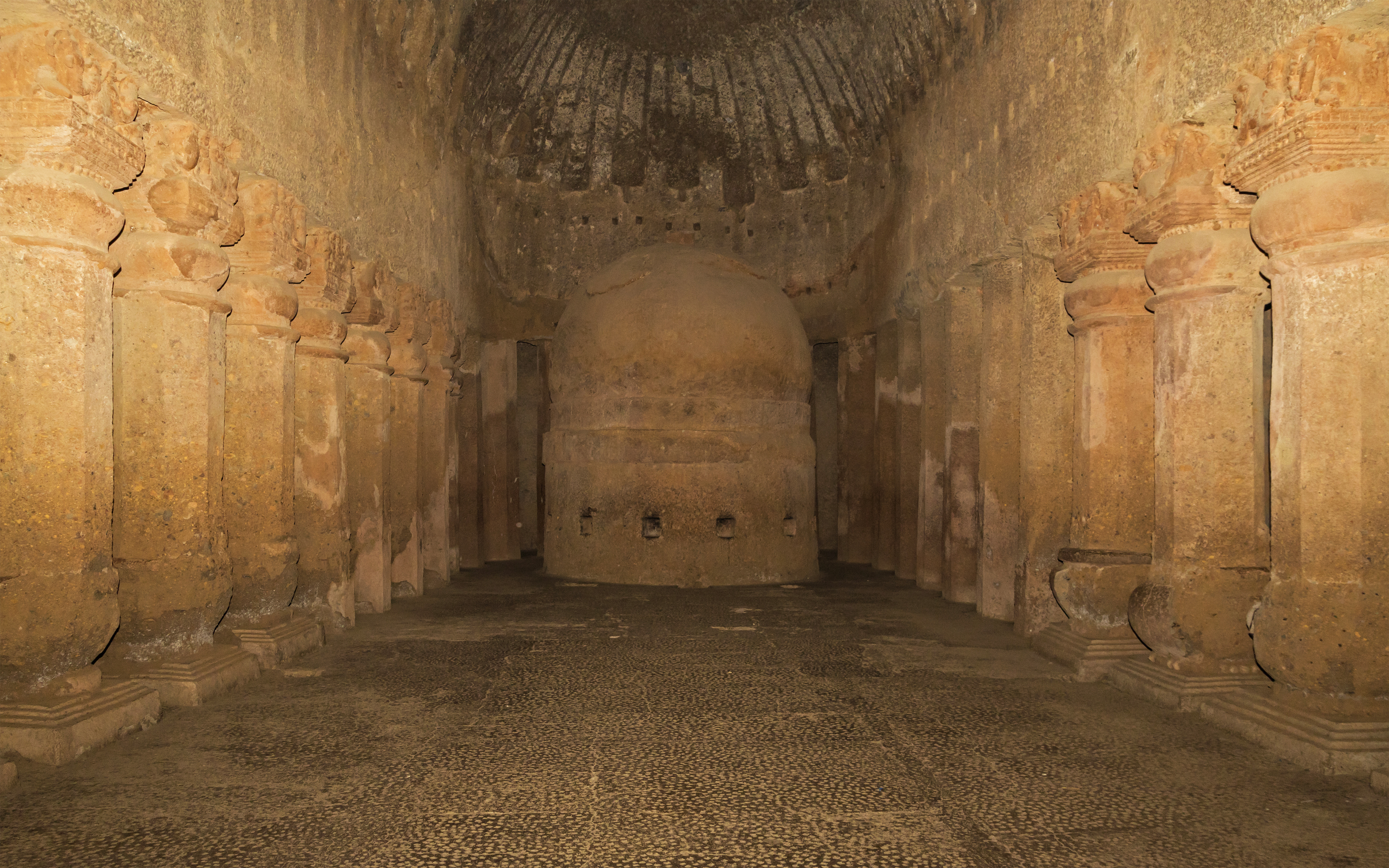
Vihara - prayer hall

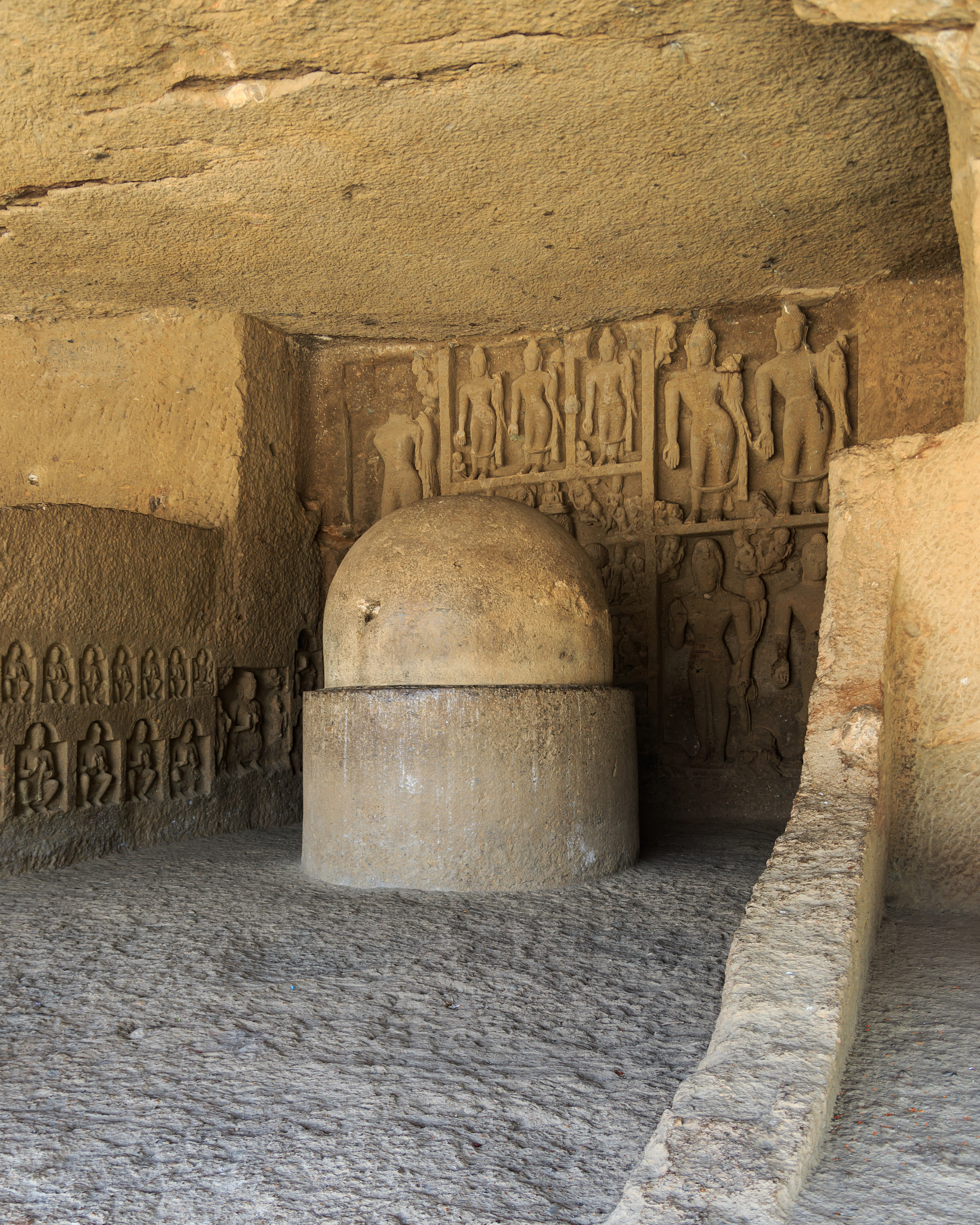
Kanheri Caves served as a center of Buddhism in Western India during ancient times

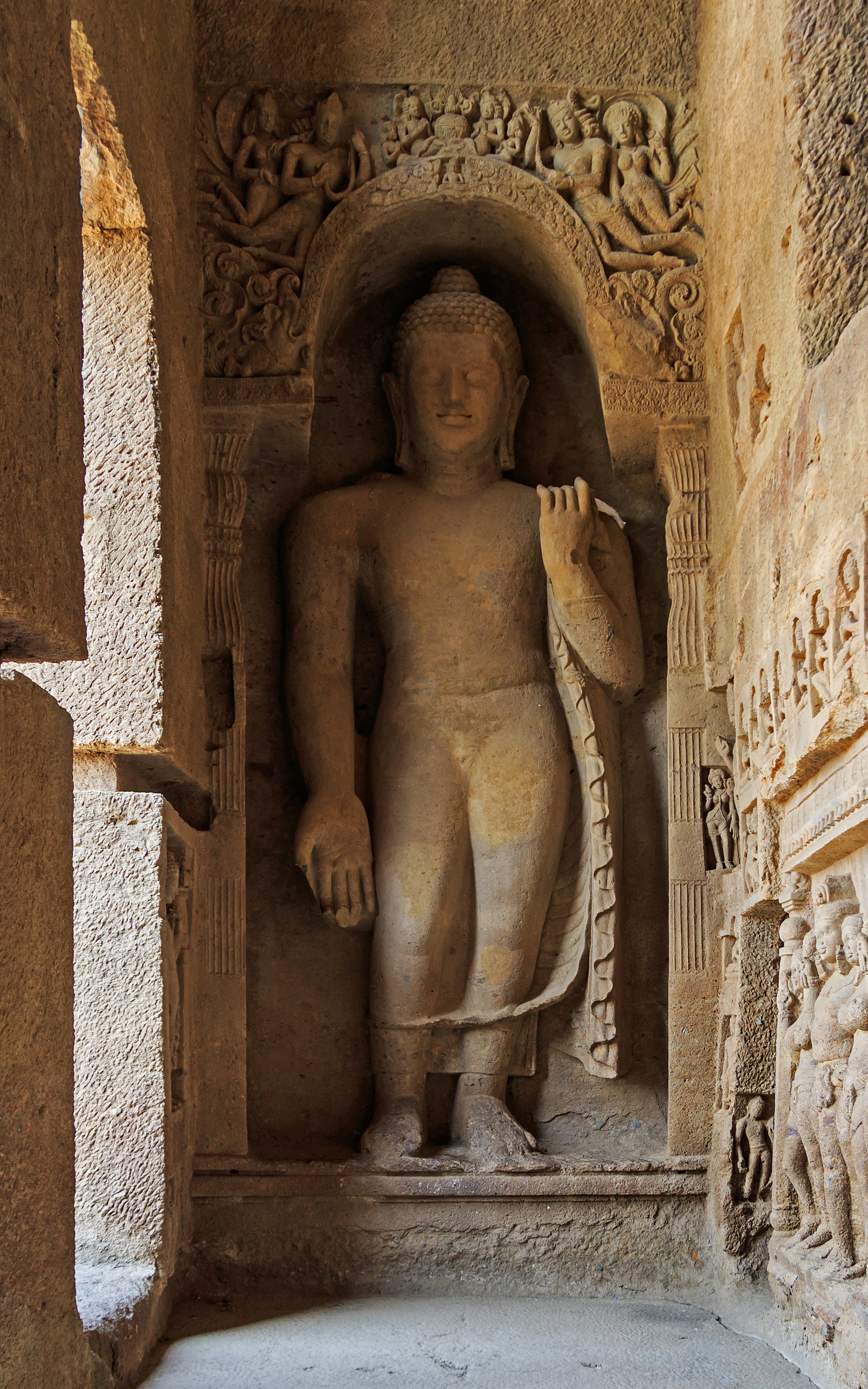
Sculpture of Buddha in a temple at Kanheri Caves

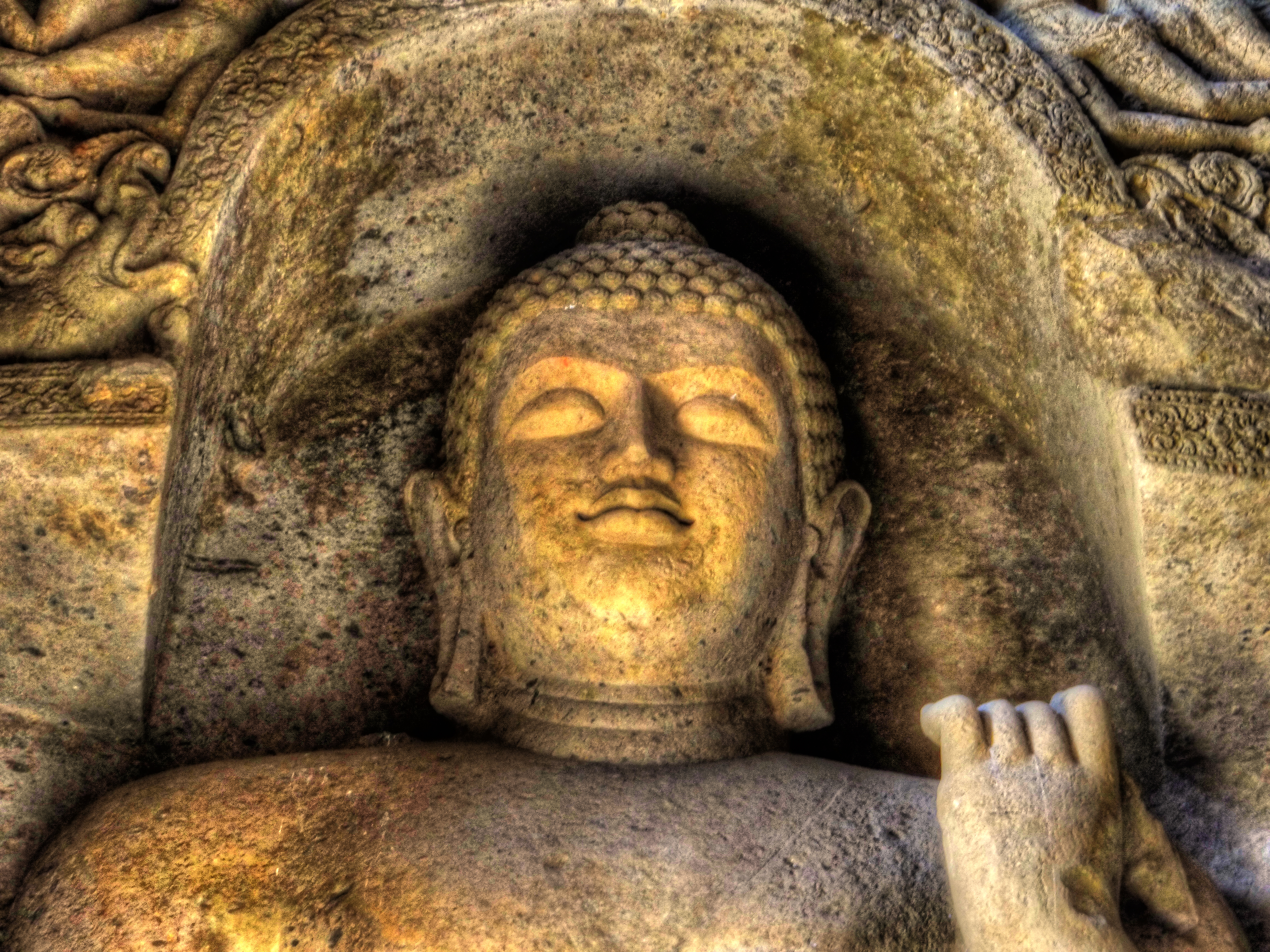
Cave sculpture of Buddha

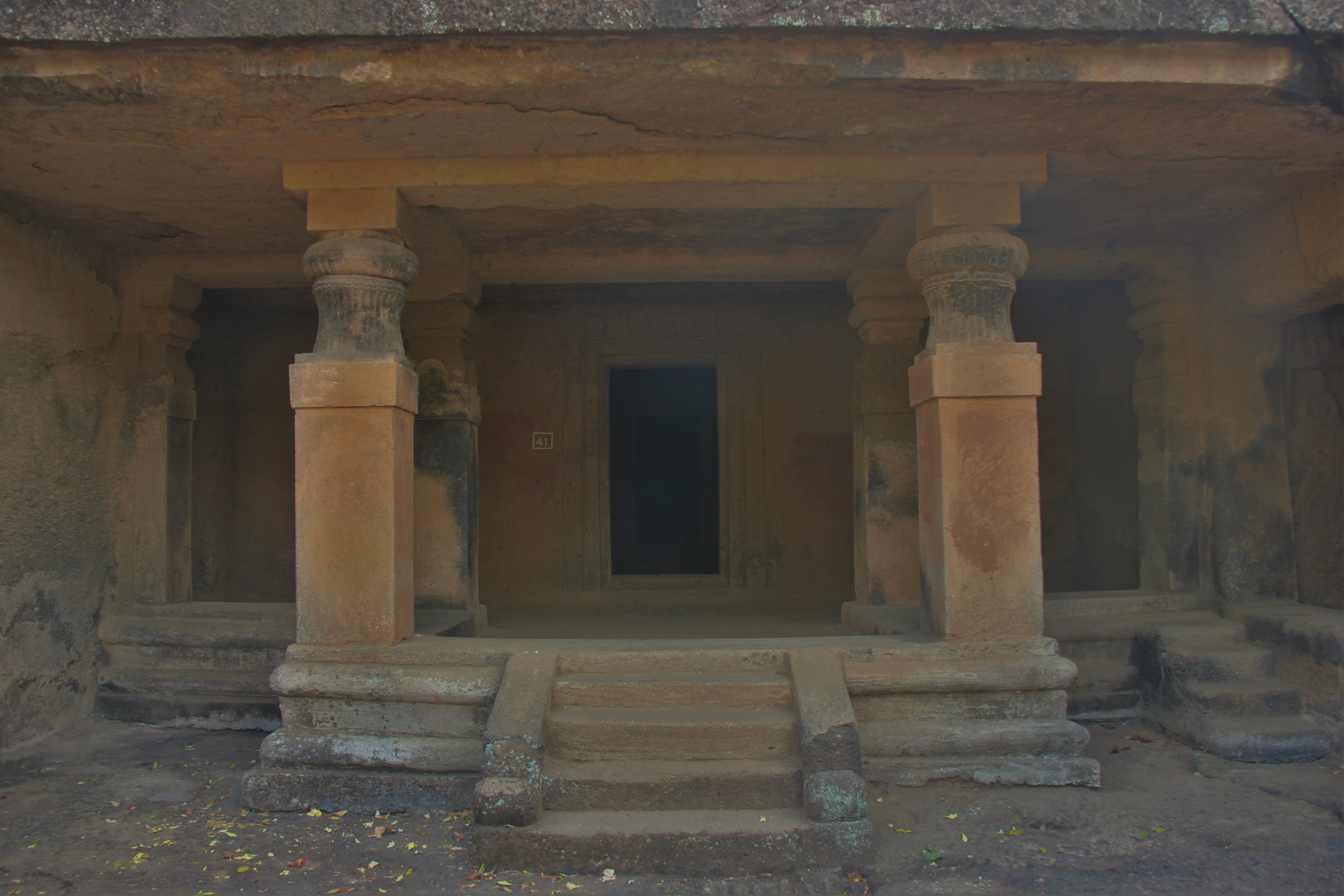
Cave 41

Water Management System

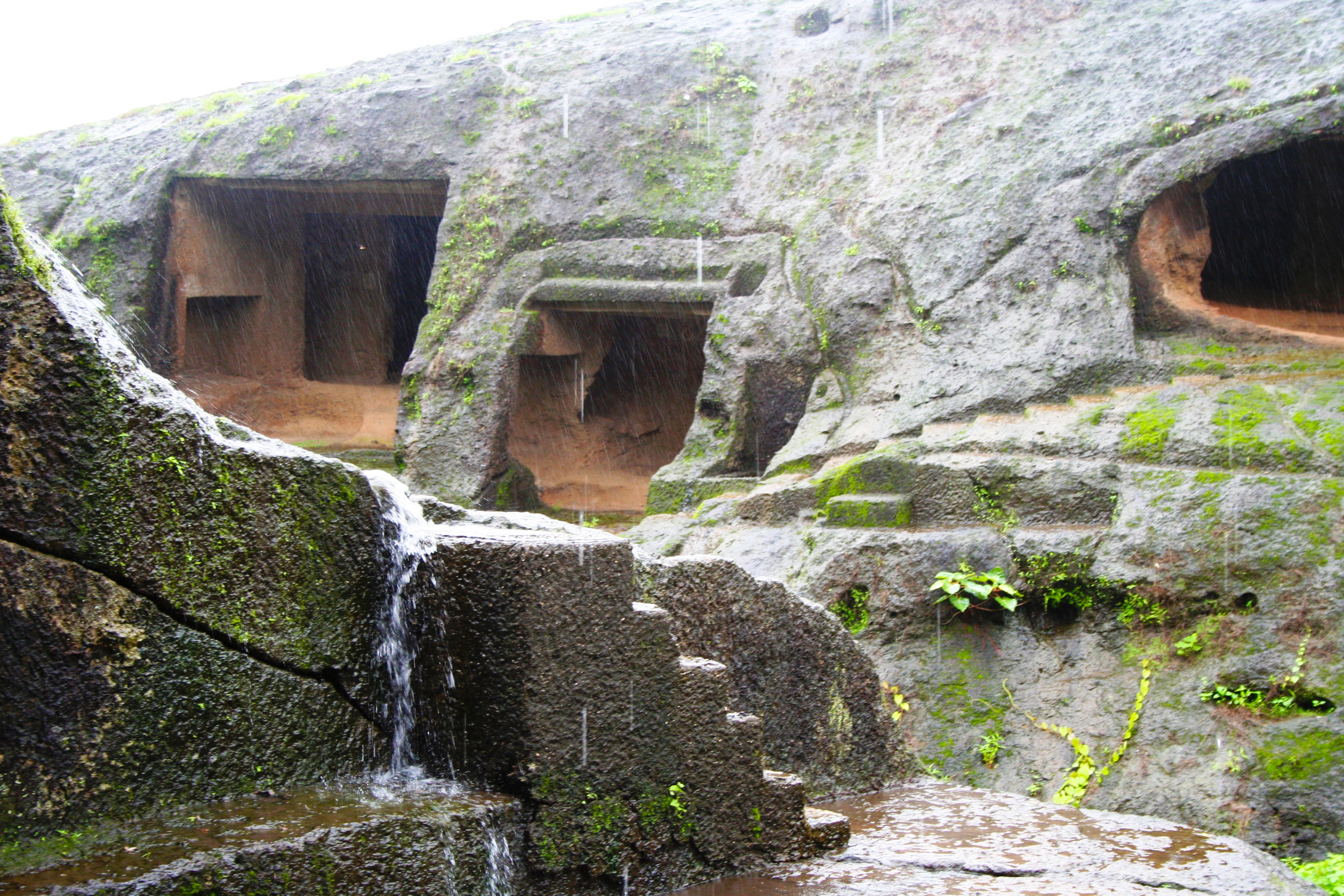
Kanehri caves water management system 6

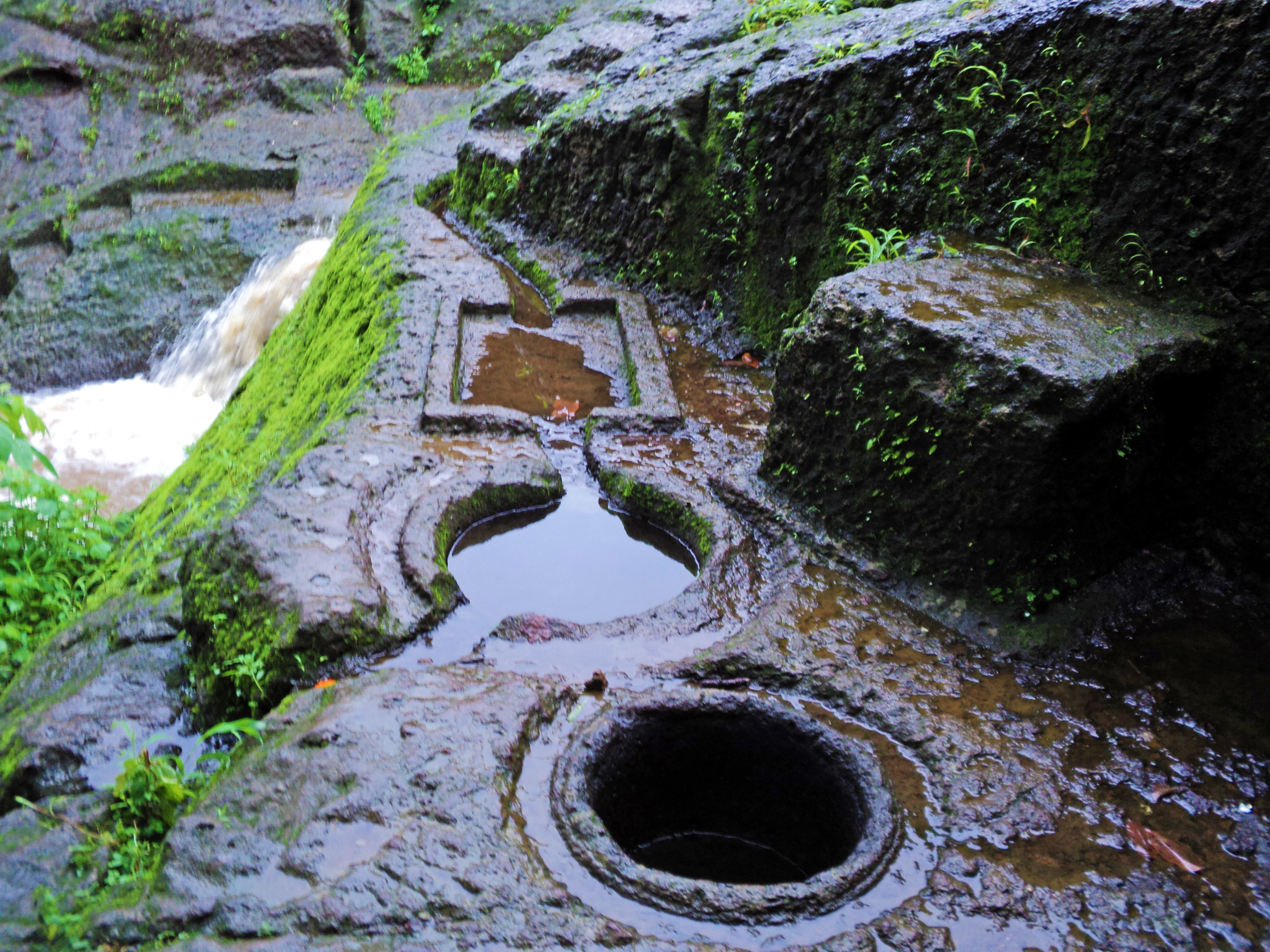
Kanehri caves water management system 4

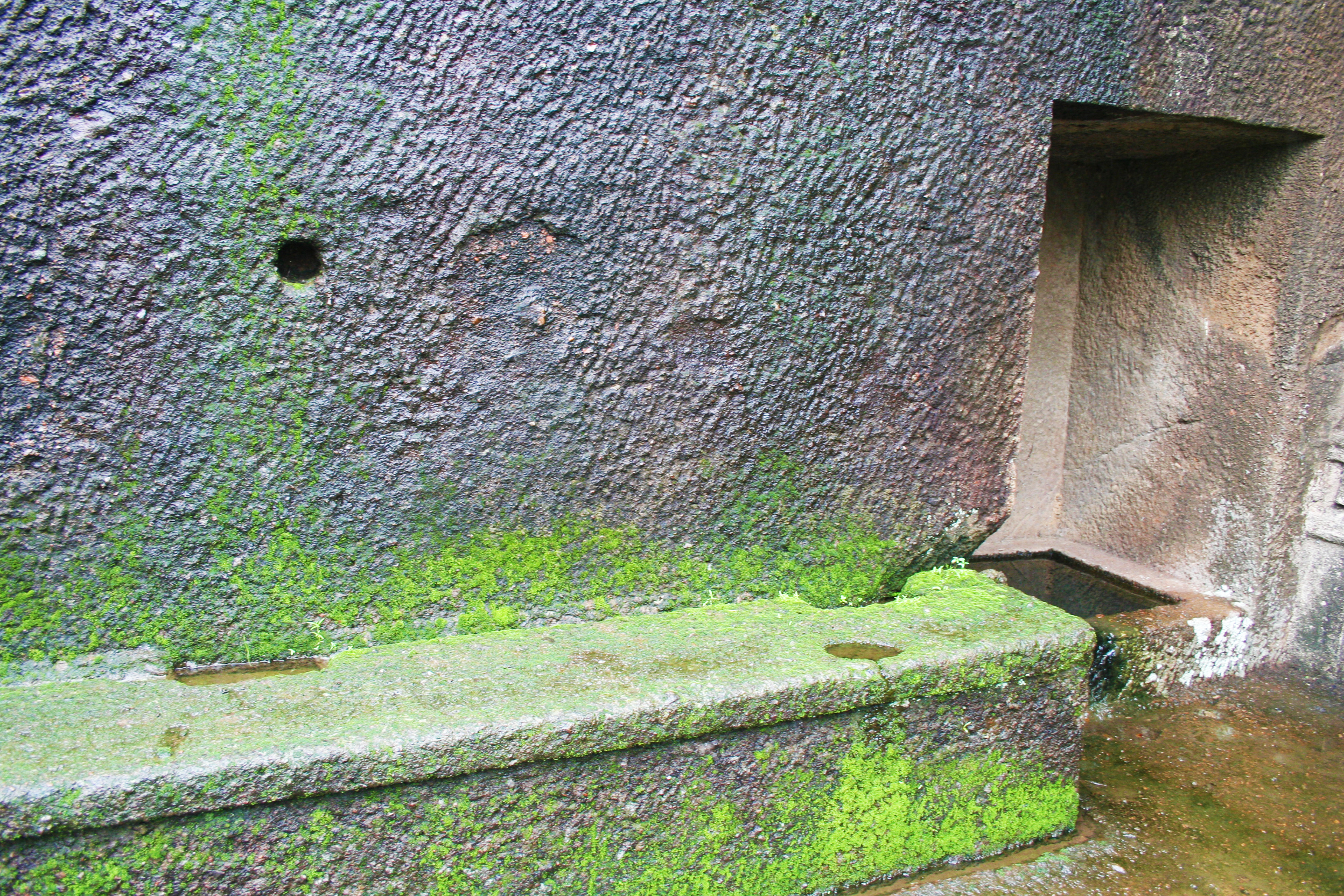
Kanehri caves water management system 5

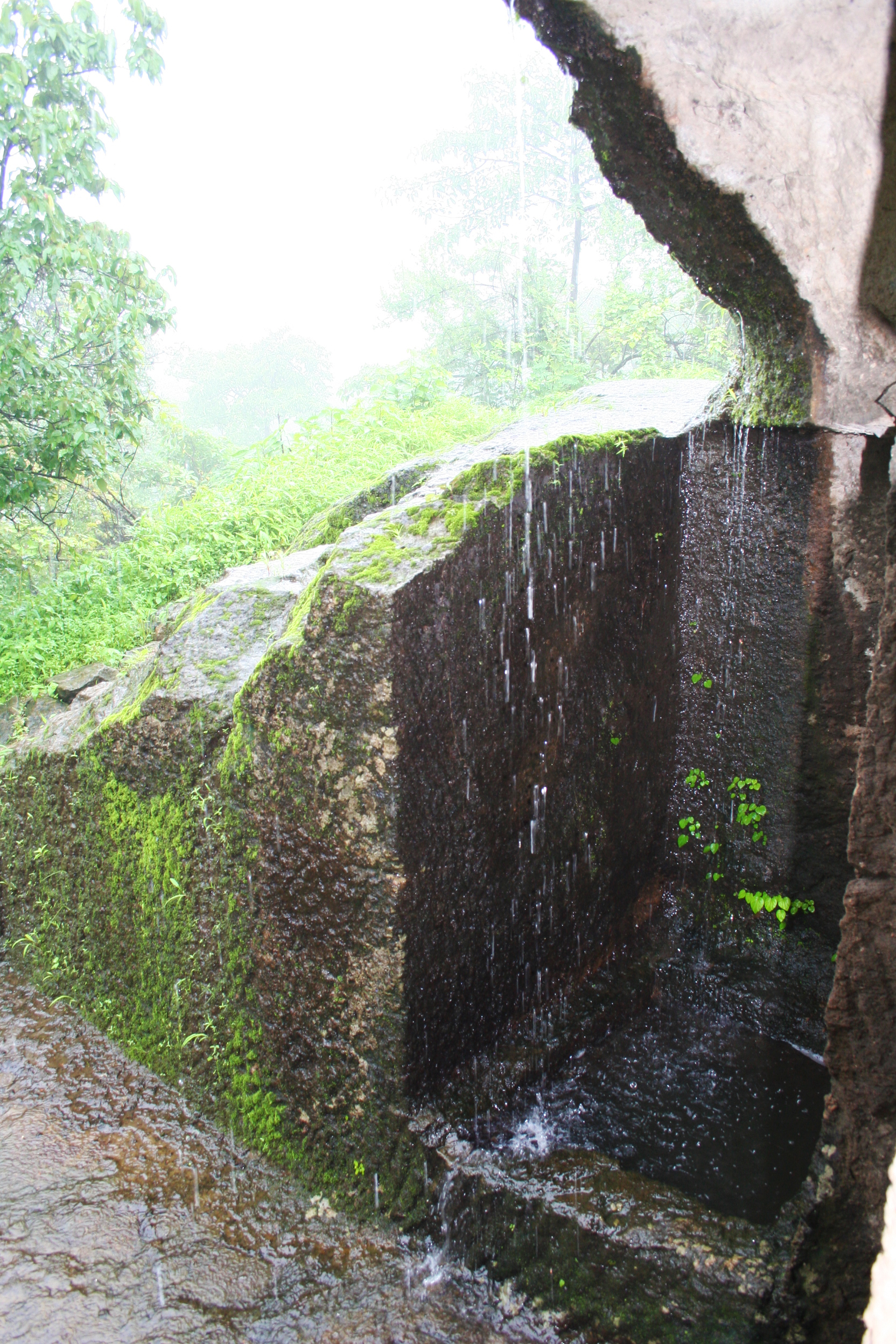
Kanehri caves water management system 7

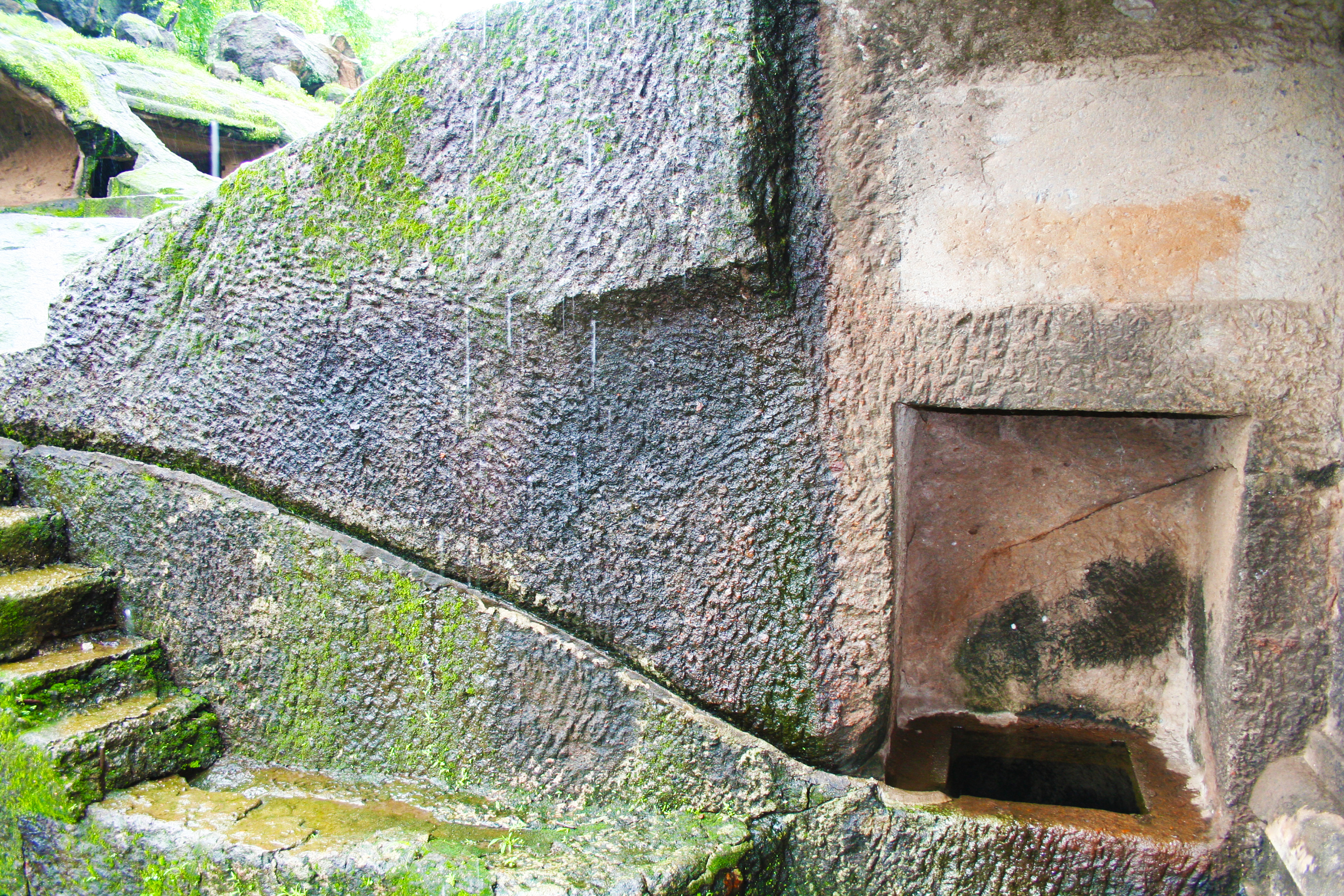
Kanehri caves water management system 8

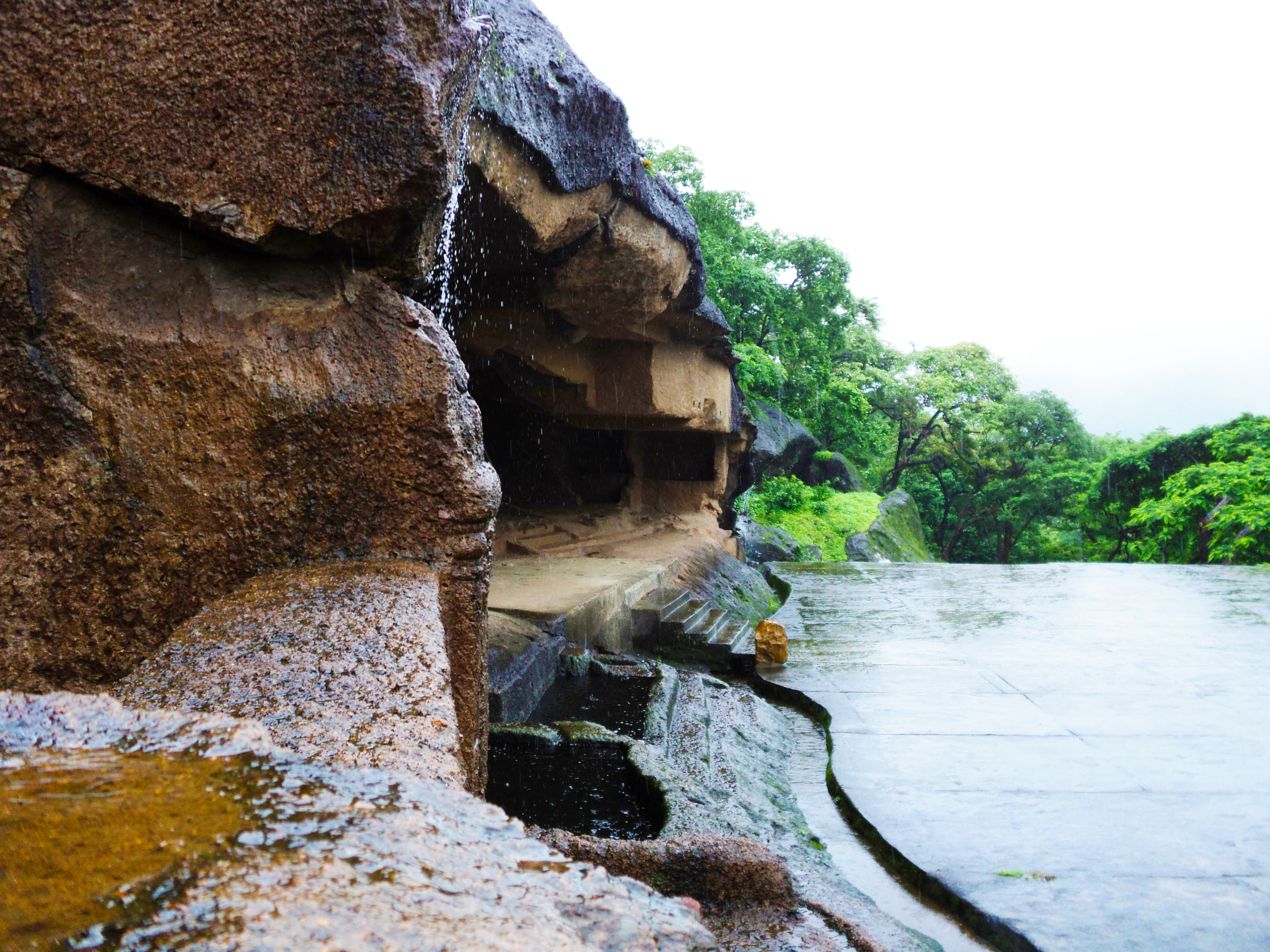
Kanehri caves water management system 1

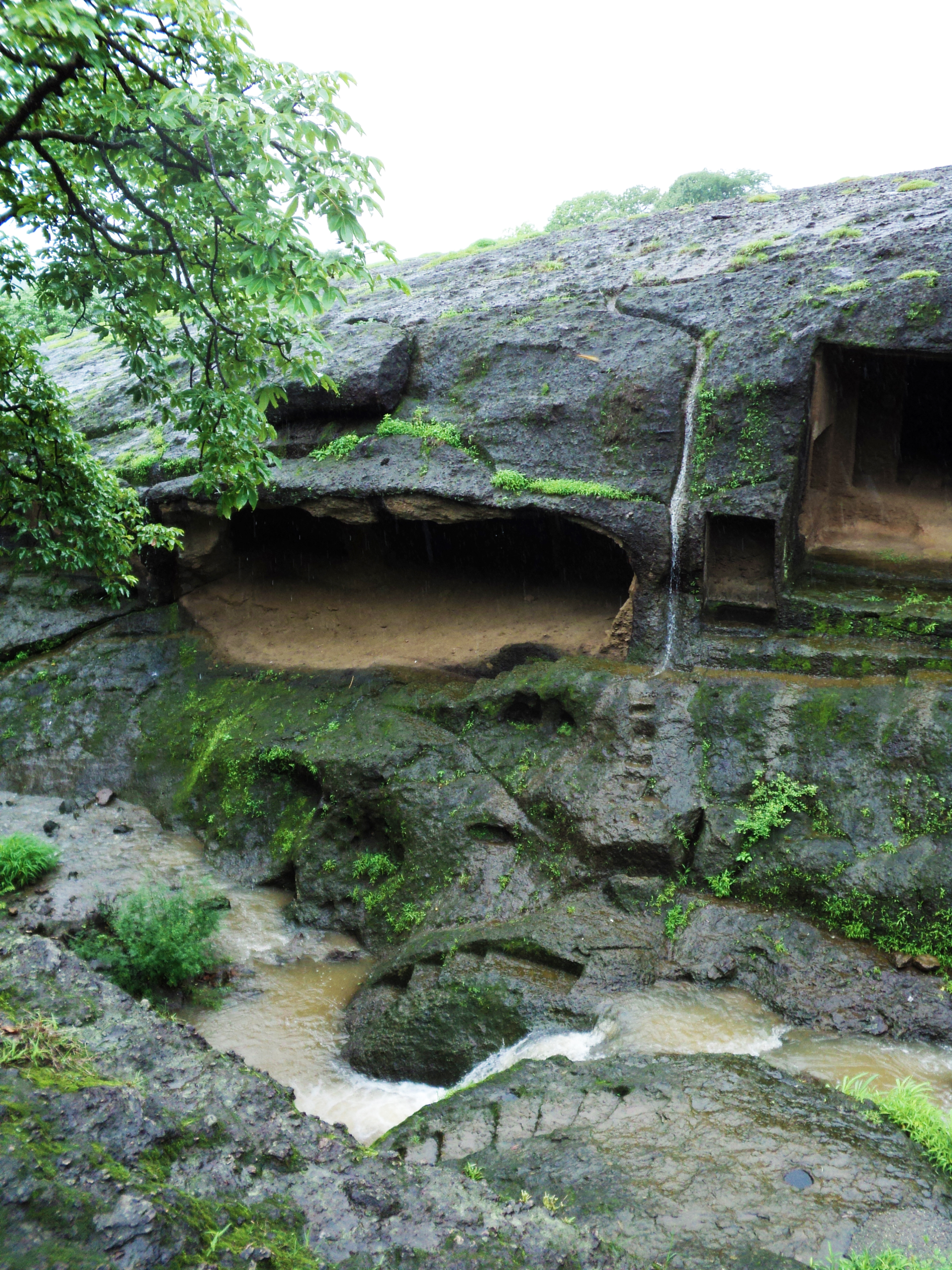
Kanehri caves water management system 2

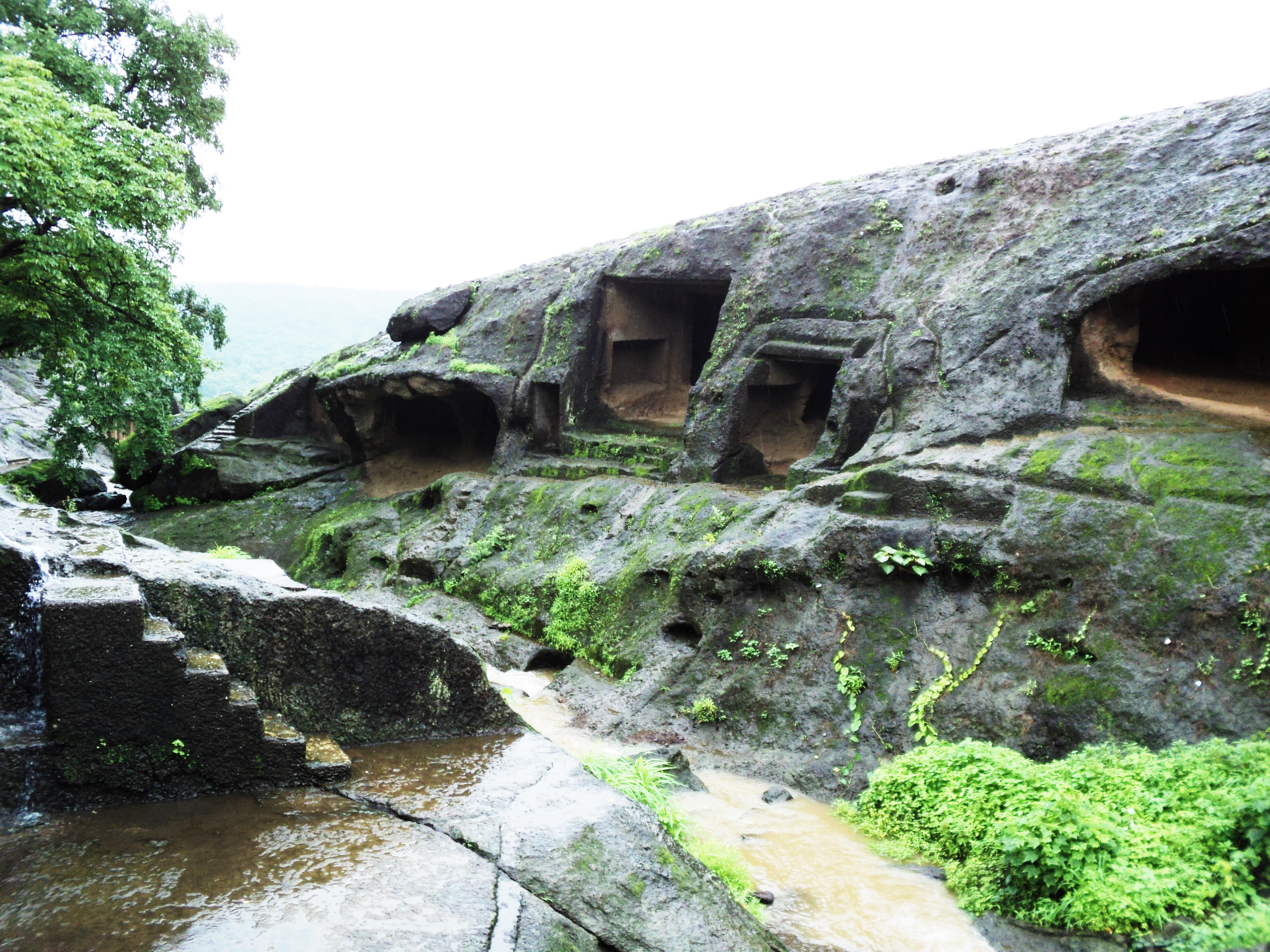
Kanehri caves water management system 3

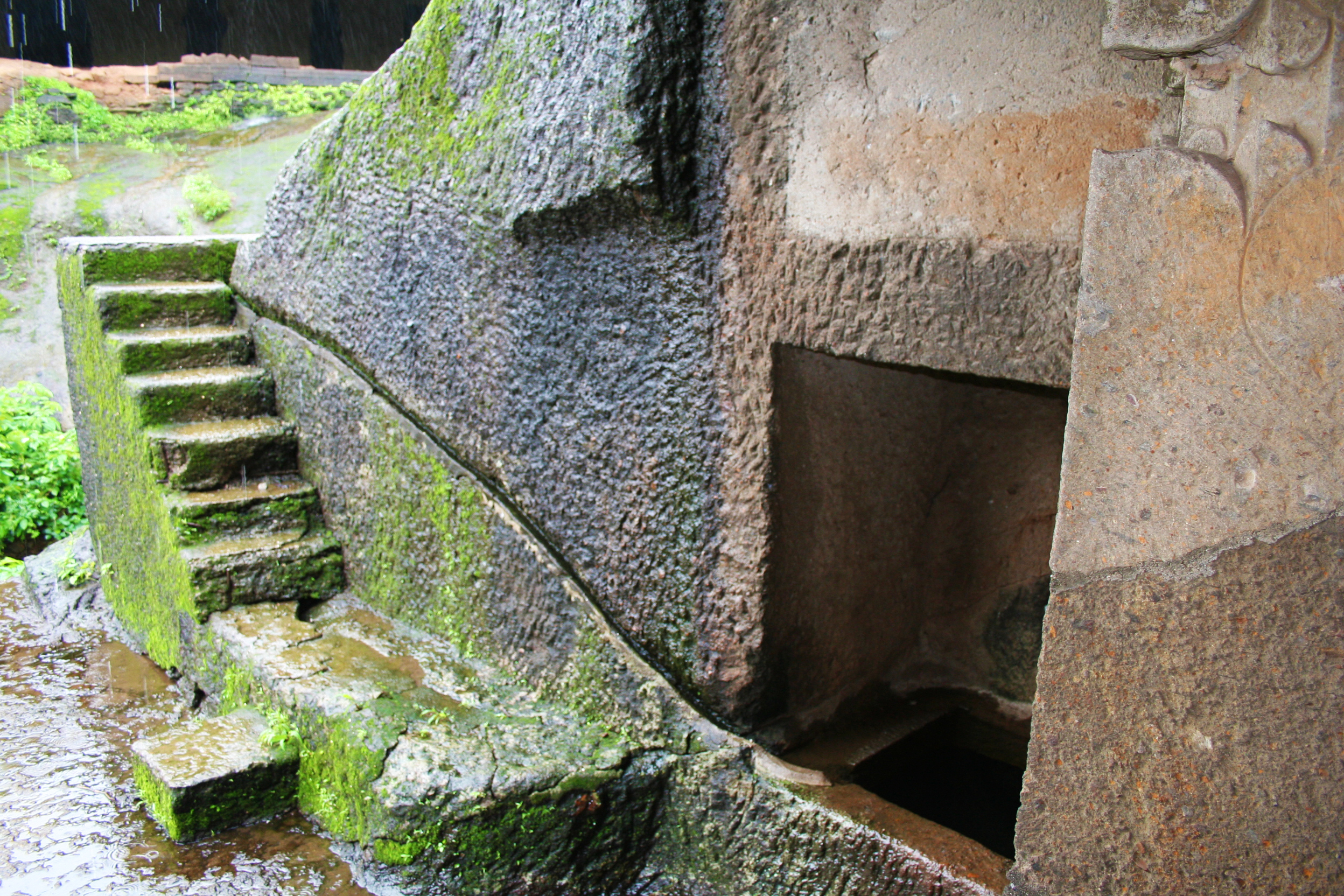
Kanehri caves water management system 9

== See also ==
- Cetiya
- Ellora Caves
- Ajanta Caves
- Bedse Caves
- Bhaja Caves
- Karla Caves
- Kondhane Caves
- Manmodi Caves
- Lenyadri Caves
- Nasik Caves
- Pitalkhora Caves
- Shivneri Caves
- List of colossal sculptures in situ
