= Kudu (disambiguation) =

Kudu is the name of two species of antelope.

Kudu may also refer to:

- Kudu, the word for turtle in several languages of southern Cameroon
- Kudu, Tamil equivalent of gavaksha, a round "window" motif in Hindu temple architectural ornament
- KUDU, a radio station
- Kudu Records, a sister label of CTI Records
- Kudu (restaurant), a chain of fast food restaurants based in Saudi Arabia
- Kudu, Russia, a selo (village) in Verkhnevilyuysky District, Sakha Republic
- Apache Kudu, a column-oriented data store of the Apache Hadoop ecosystem
- Atlas Kudu, an airplane

== See also ==
- Kudus (disambiguation)
