= Kudus =

Kudus may refer to

- Merhawi Kudus (born 1994), Eritrean cyclist
- Mohammed Kudus (born 2000), Ghanaian footballer
- Sunan Kudus (died 1550), founder of:
  - Kudus, Indonesia, capital city of:
    - Kudus Regency in Central Java, Indonesia
    - Persiku Kudus, football team from Kudus, Kudus
    - Koedoes Residency, a Residency in Central Java, Dutch East Indies from 1925 to 1931
    - Menara Kudus Mosque in Kudus, Kudus
- Gereja Kristen Kalam Kudus, proselytic mission of the Evangelize China Fellowship in Indonesia
- Küdus, the historical Ottoman/Turkish name for Jerusalem

== See also ==
- Kudos (disambiguation)
- Kudu (disambiguation)
