= Cudos =

Cudos may refer to:

- Cudos, Gironde, a town in France
- Centre for Ultrahigh Bandwidth Devices for Optical Systems, an Australian research consortium
- Mertonian norms

== See also ==
- Kudos (disambiguation)
