= Bedse Caves =

Group of Buddhist rock-cut monuments in Maharashtra, India

Coordinates: 18°44′51.75″N 73°31′57.5″E

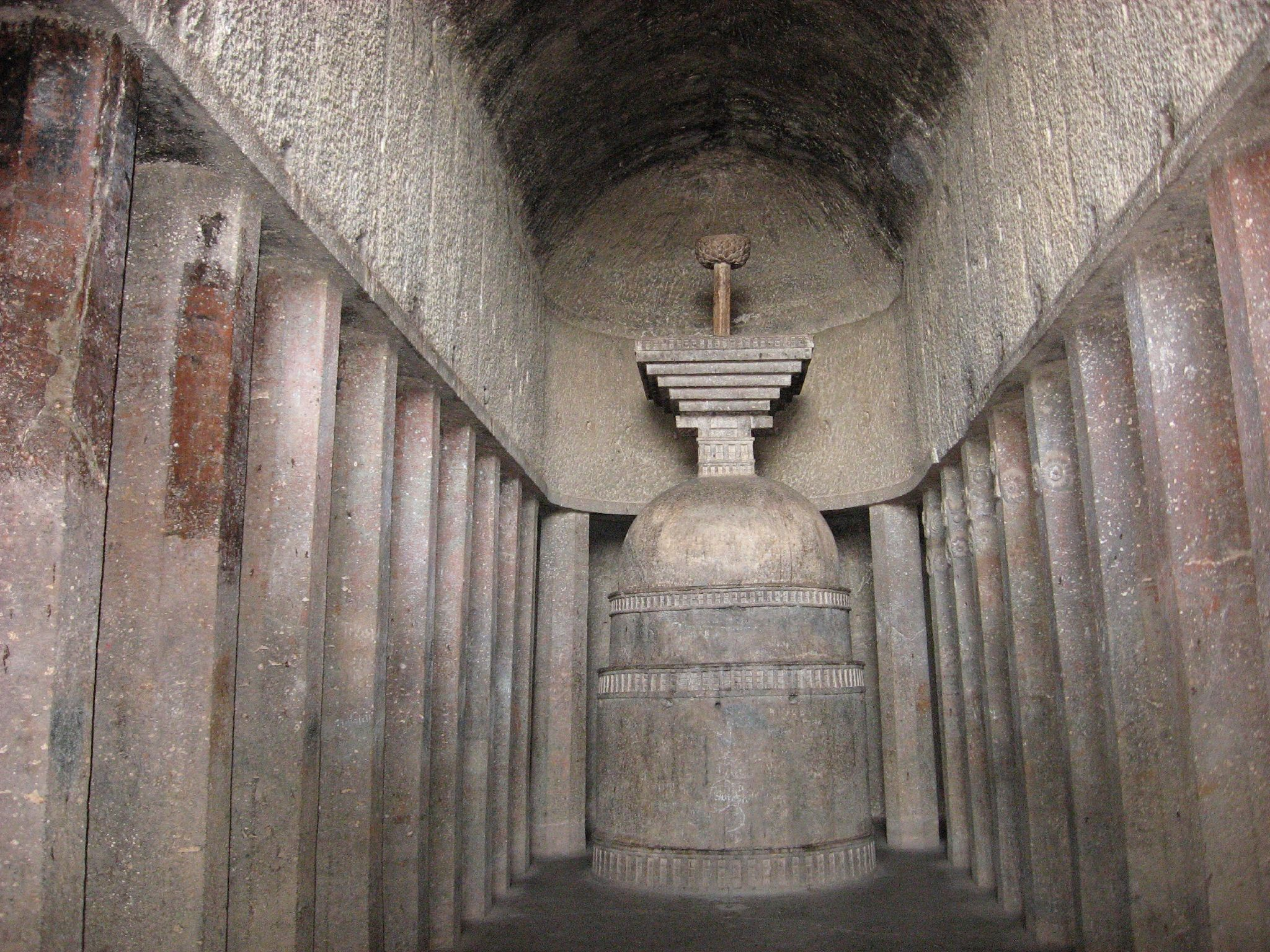
- The Chaityagrha in the cave
- Location: Maval taluka, Pune District, Maharashtra, India
- Geology: Basalt
- Difficulty: easy
- Pronunciation: Bedse or Bedsa

Bedse Caves (also known as Bedsa Caves) are a group of Buddhist rock-cut monuments situated in Maval taluka, Pune District, Maharashtra, India. The history of the caves can be traced back to the Satavahana period in the 1st century BCE. They are some 9 km from the Bhaja Caves. Other caves in the area are Karla Caves, Patan Buddhist Cave and Nasik Caves.

There are two main caves. The best known cave is the chaitya (prayer hall - Cave 7) with a comparatively large stupa, the other cave is the monastery or vihara (Cave 11). They are marked by a profusion of decorative gavaksha or chaitya arch motifs.

== Chaitya ==
Cave 7, the chaitya hall, is reached by a long narrow passage into the rock. The front verandah has four very elaborate columns with capitals of pairs of animals and riders of "solemn grandeur". Beside these the side walls are covered with low-relief gavakshas and latticework representing architectural railings, comparable to those in the same place at the slightly later chaitya in the Karla Caves. In contrast, and unlike Karla, the chaitya hall itself has little decoration, with plain octagonal columns. The decorative ribs on the roof, which in other chaityas are stone replicating wooden architecture, were actual wood here, and have been lost.

An inscription on one of the gate arches reads: Gift of Pushyanka, son of Ananda Sethi from Nashik.

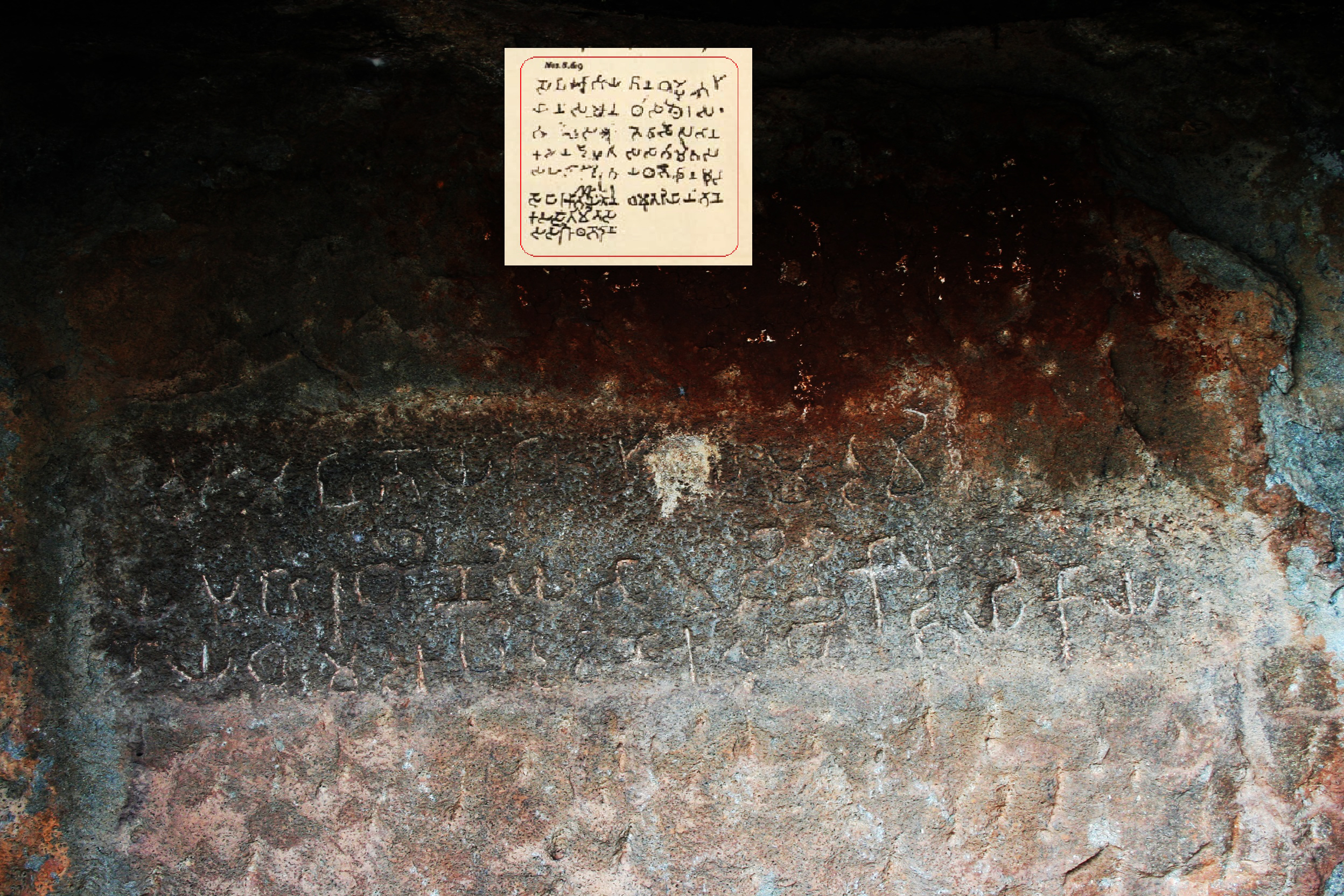
Bedsa caves inscriptions

== Vihara ==
The vihara at Cave 11 has a rather unusual form, with a main chamber shaped somewhat like a chaitya, with a rectangular plan with a rounded apsidal far end, and a vaulted roof. This is now open to the outside, but presumably originally had a wooden screen. Around the chamber are nine doors to cells, each with a relief chaitya-arch surround. Friezes with railing patterns run round the room at two levels. There are four further cells outside where the screen would have been.

== Other ==
There is also a small stupa outside to the right of the main caves. Until around 1861 the caves were regularly maintained - even painted. These works were ordered by local authorities in order to please British officers who often visited caves. This has caused loss of the remnants of plaster with murals on it.

== Visiting ==
Both caves face eastwards so it is recommended to visit the caves in the early morning, as in sunlight the beauty of carvings is enhanced.

Bedse Caves can be reached from Pune via Kamshet. Upon reaching Kamshet Chowk, left route is to be taken. That route goes straight to Bedse Village where the caves are located. They can also be reached via Paud - Tikona Peth - Pawananagar. Alternate route is from Somatne-Phata on the Pune-Mumbai NH4 Highway.

Bedse Caves are comparatively less known and less visited. People know about the nearby Karla Caves and Bhaja Caves but have hardly heard of Bedse Caves. The trilogy of the caves (Karla - Bhaje - Bedse) in Mawal Region can't be completed without Bedse. An easy hike through 400 steps leads to the caves. Also close to the Bedse caves are the famous foursome of Lohagad, Visapur, Tung and Tikona forts adjoining the Pawana Dam.

The best time to visit Bedse Caves is the rainy season as the hills are filled with lush greenery during that time. Also many small waterfalls are created that can only be enjoyed during the rainy season. As this is one of the lesser known spots, not many tourists throng the place, so makes it easy to enjoy the views.

== Gallery ==
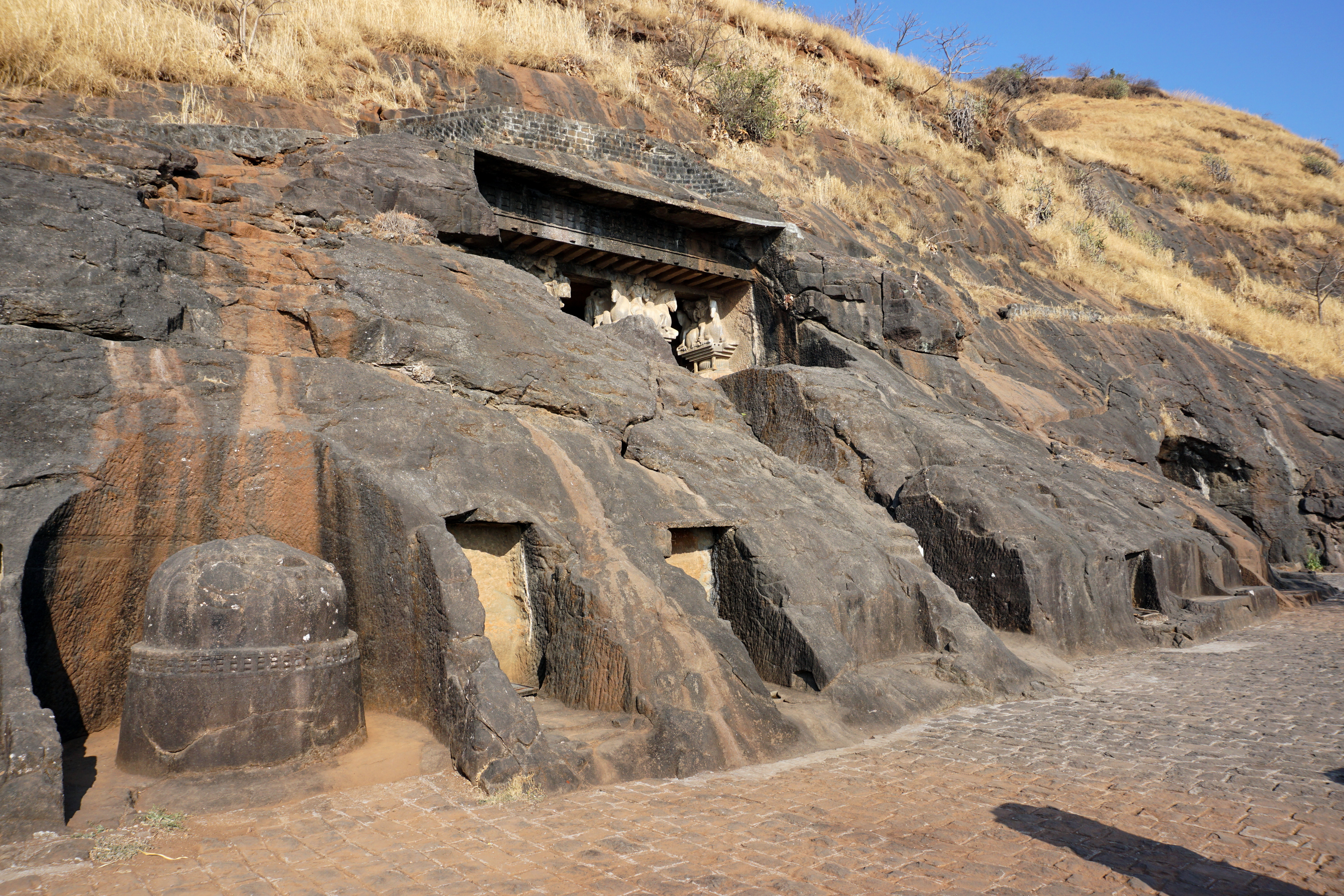
General view, with the top of the chaitya entrance columns visible, and the outside stupa

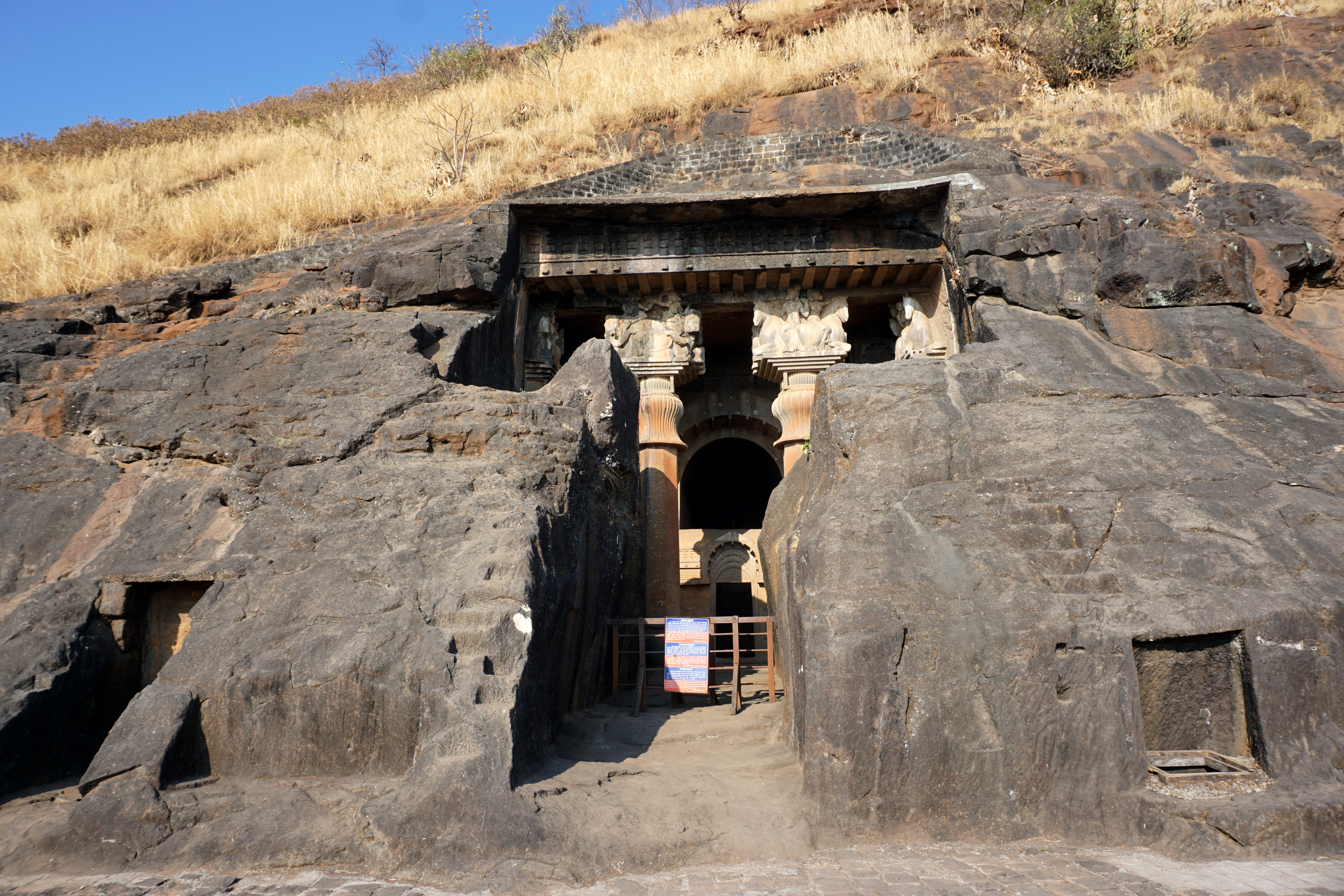
Entrance to the Chaitya Hall

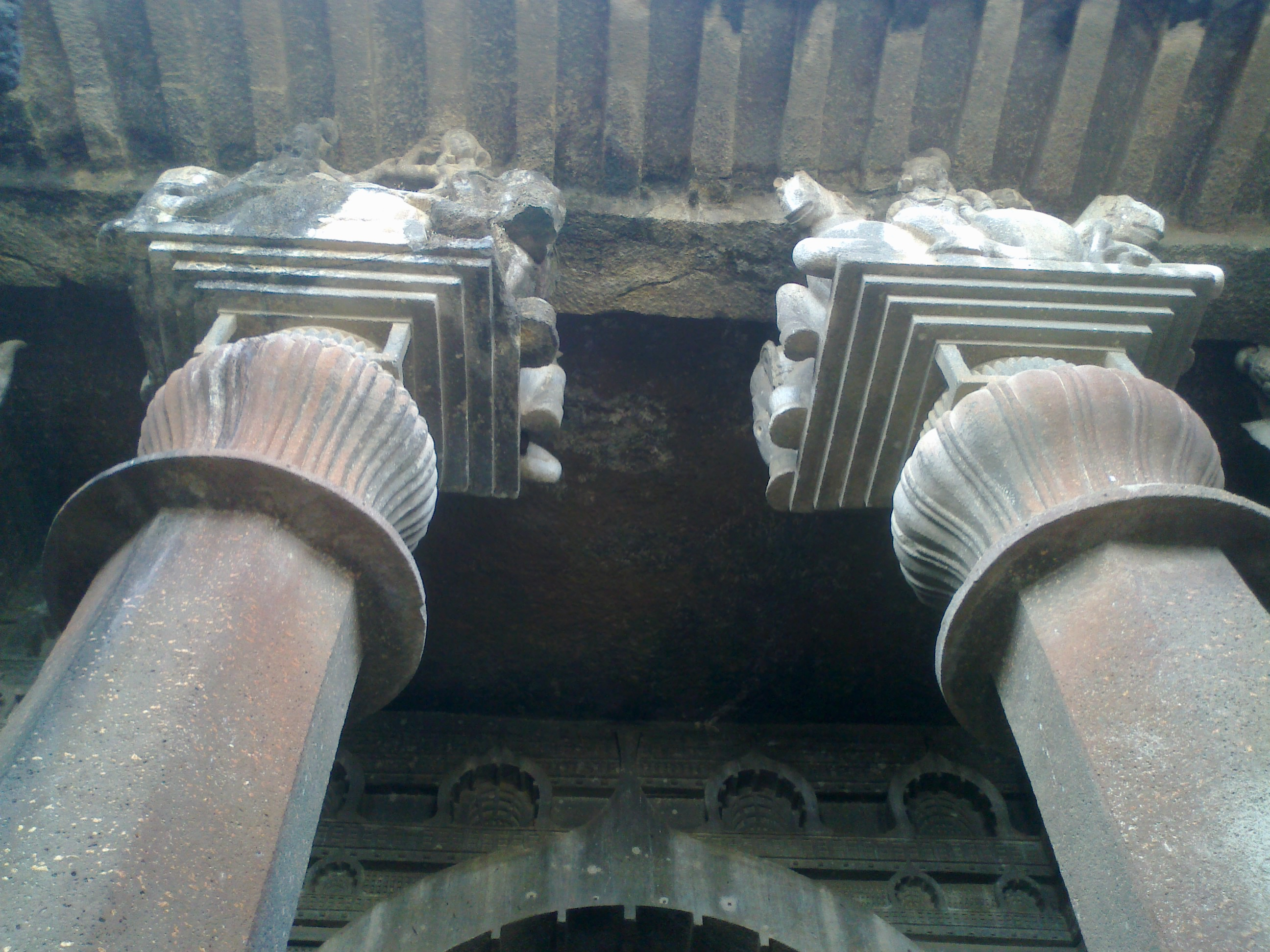
Columns at chaitya entrance

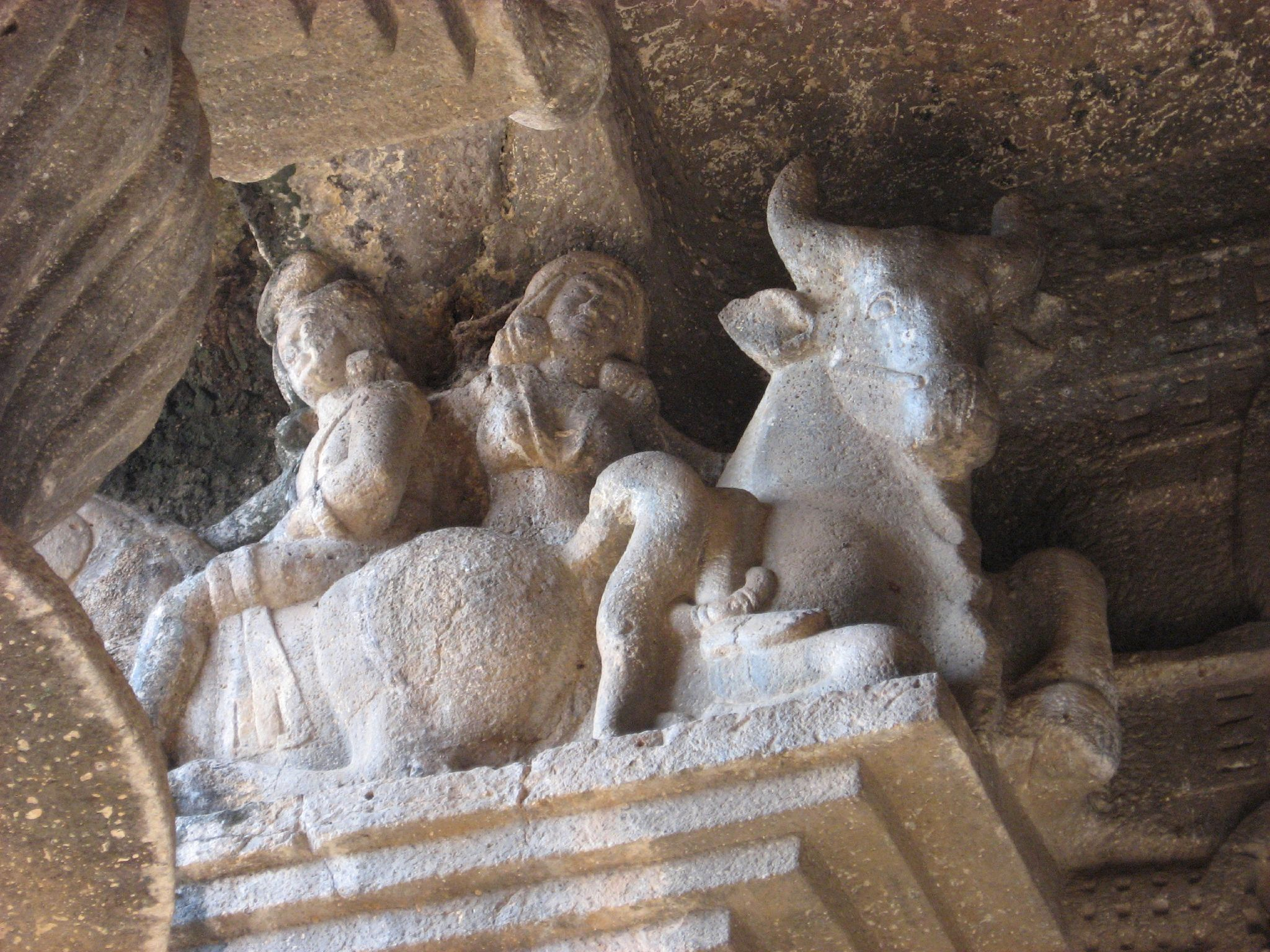
Capital of a column above the main entrance

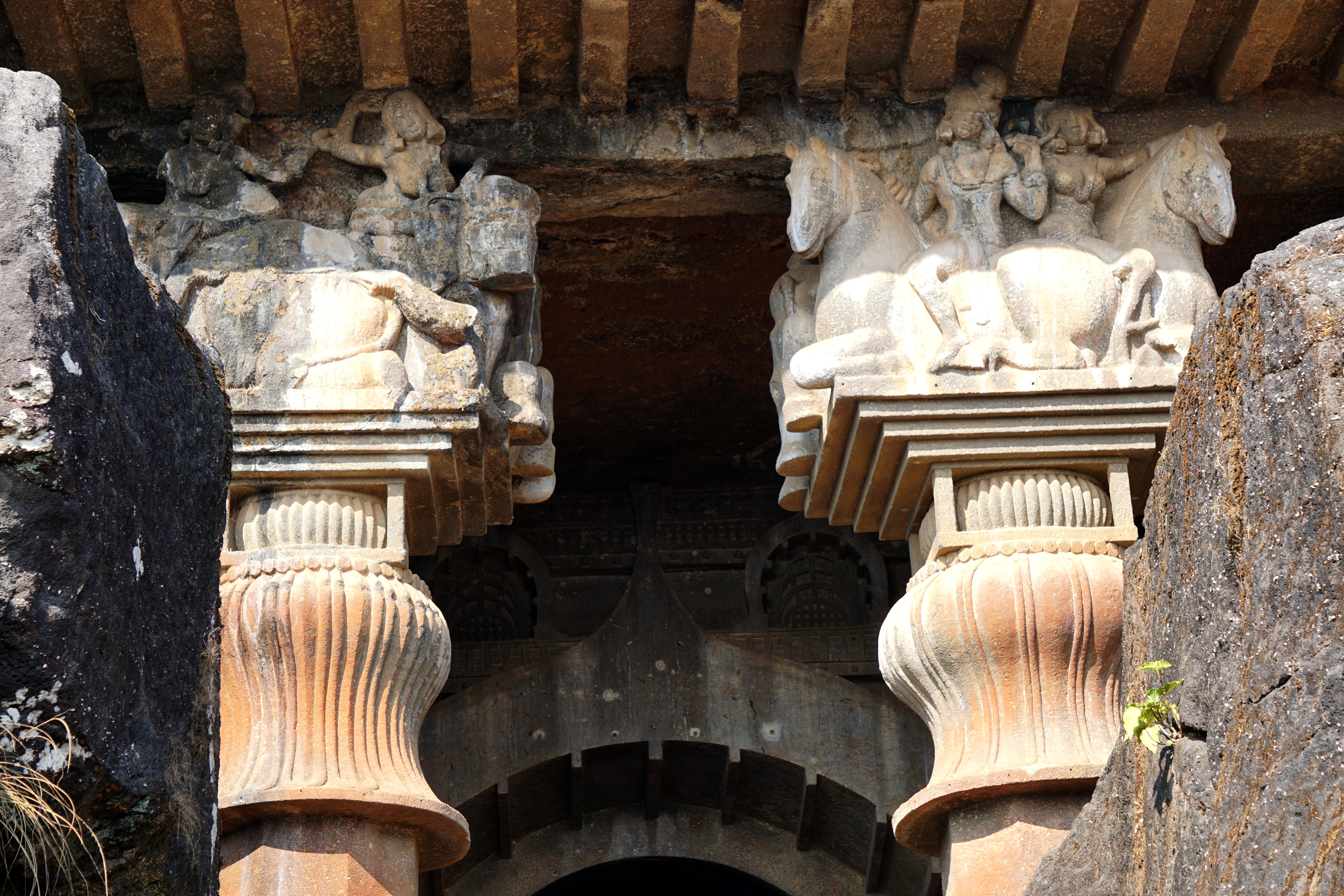
Capitals

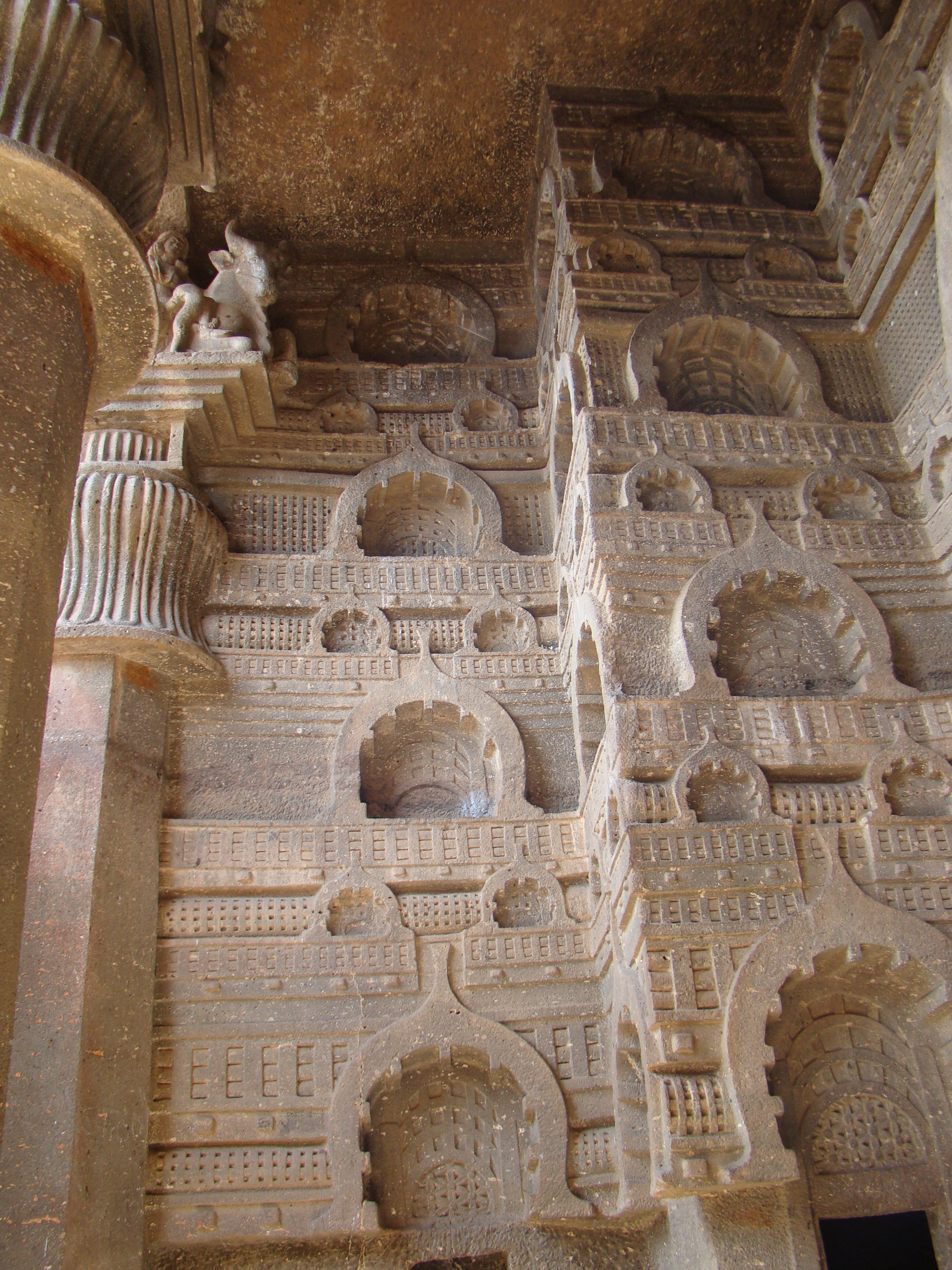
Side wall inside the chaitya verandah

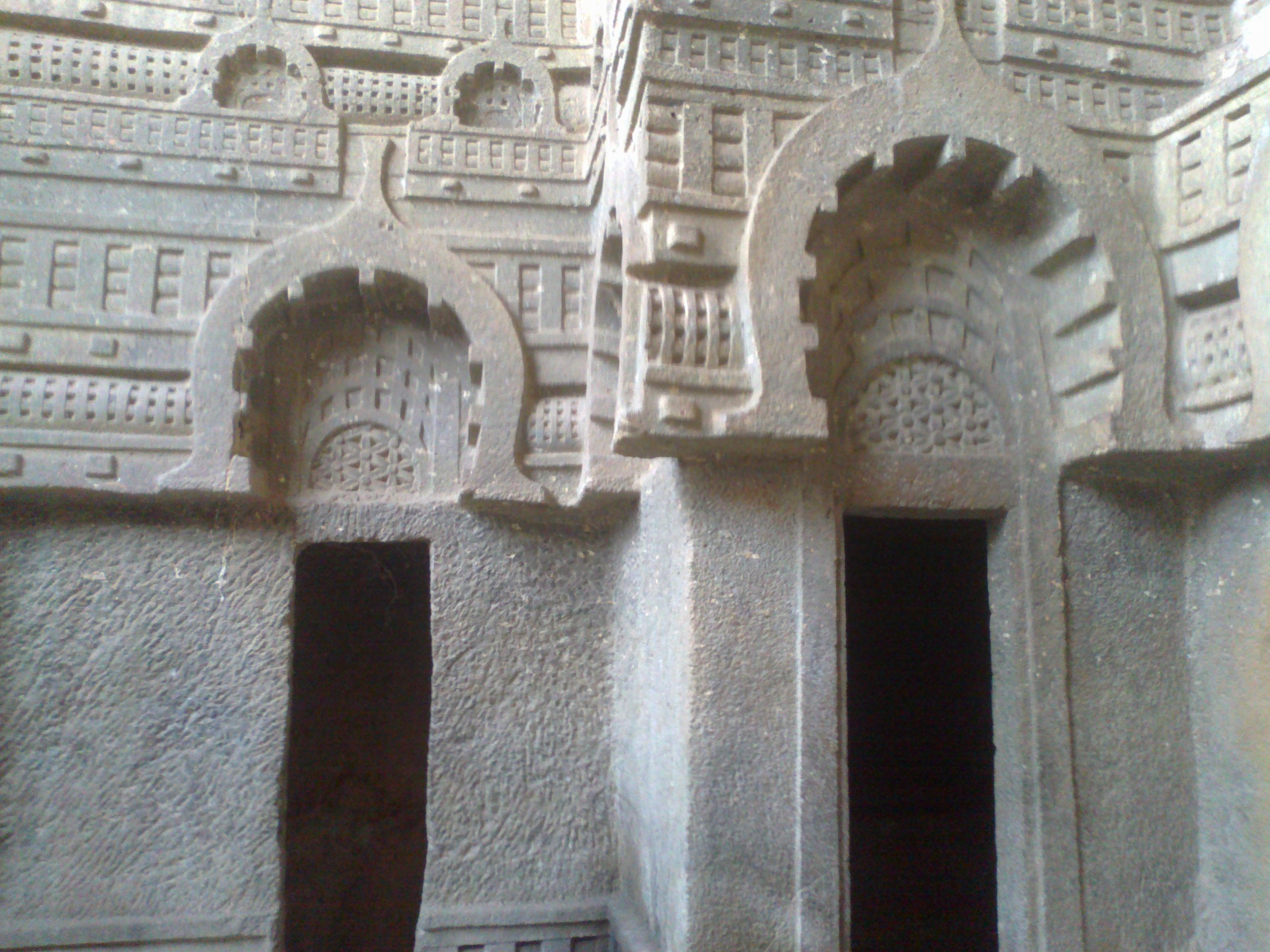
Peepal leaves on gavaksha arches

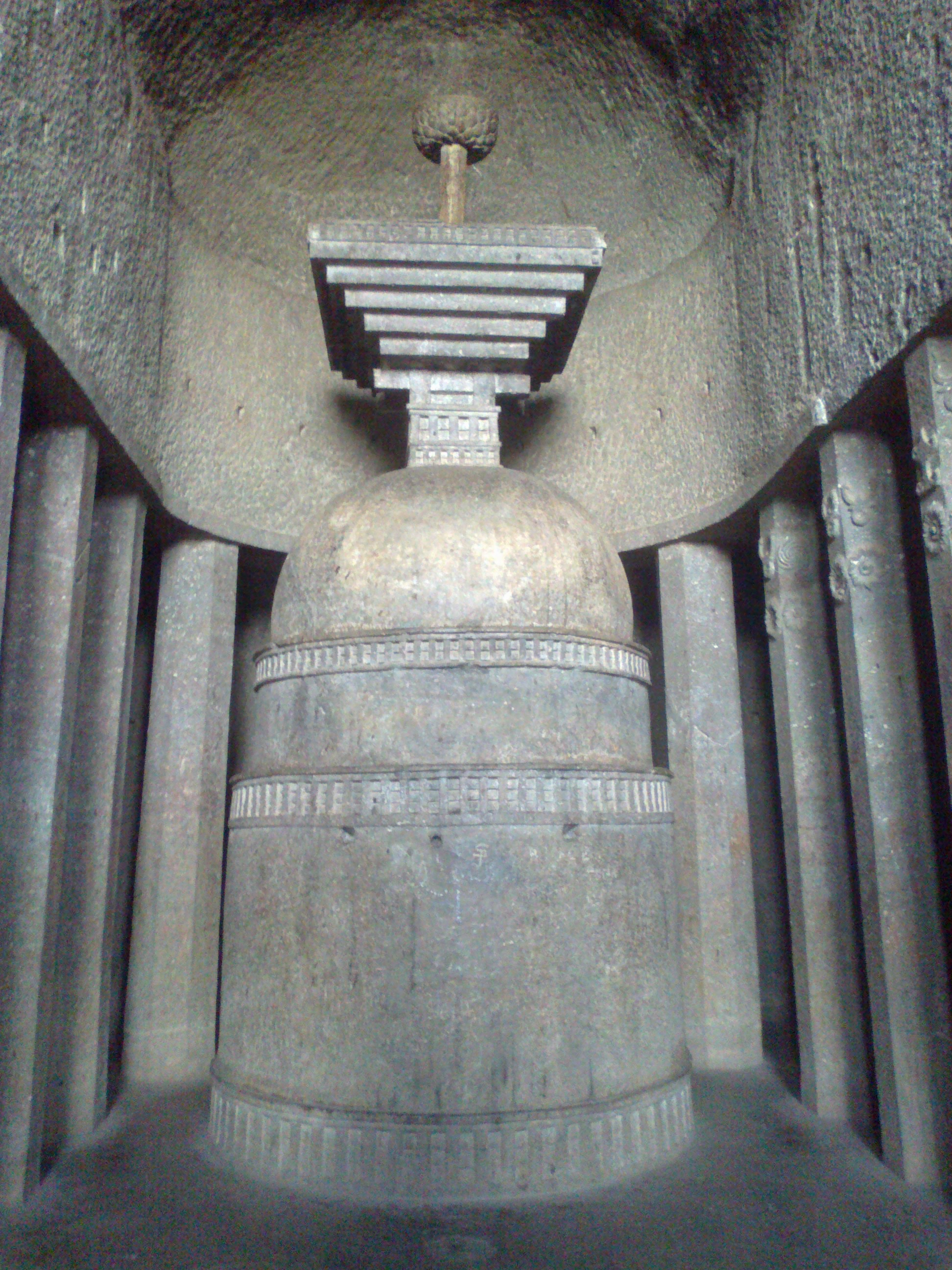
The stupa in the chaitya

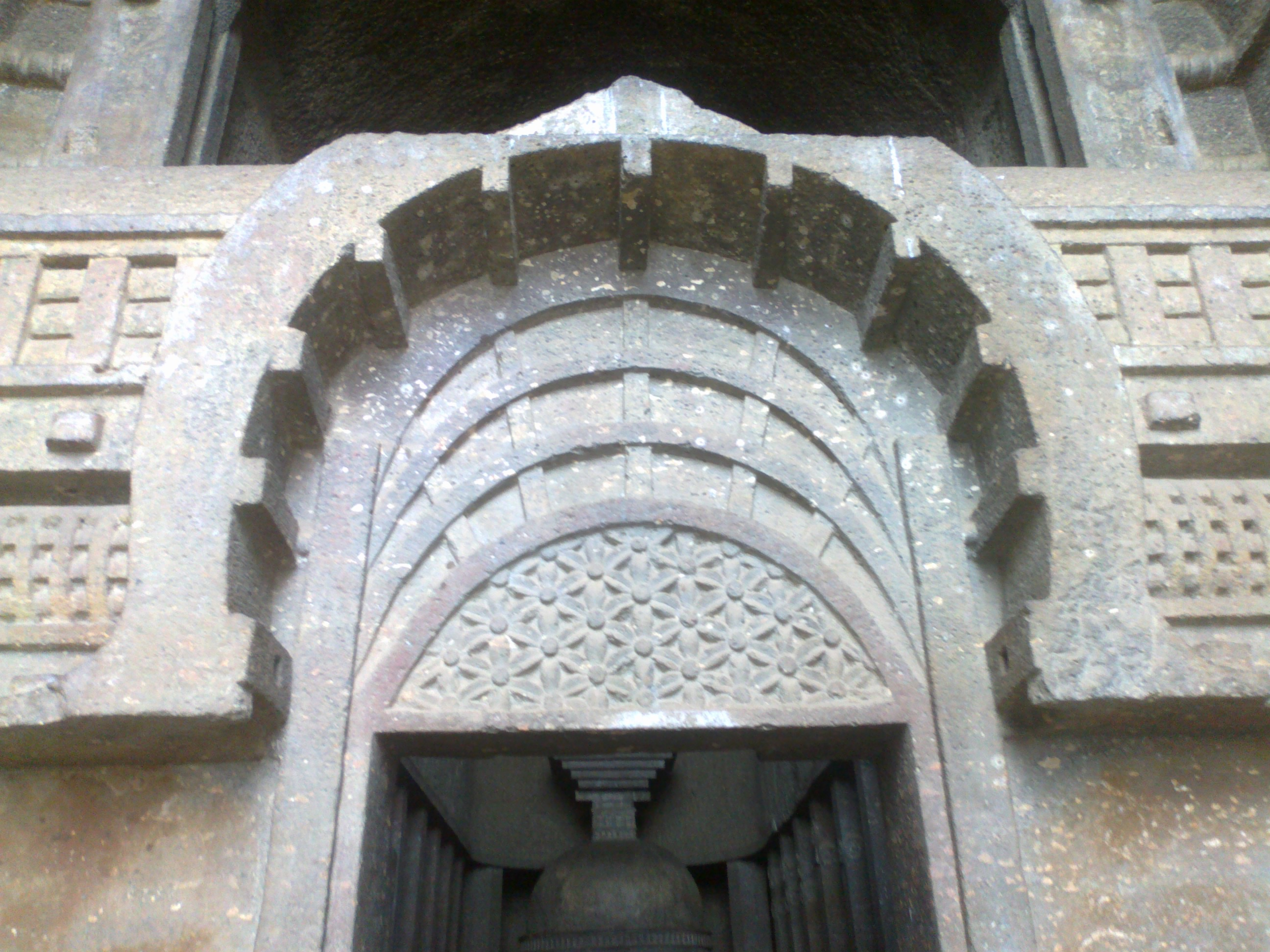
Floral Carving over chaitya doorway

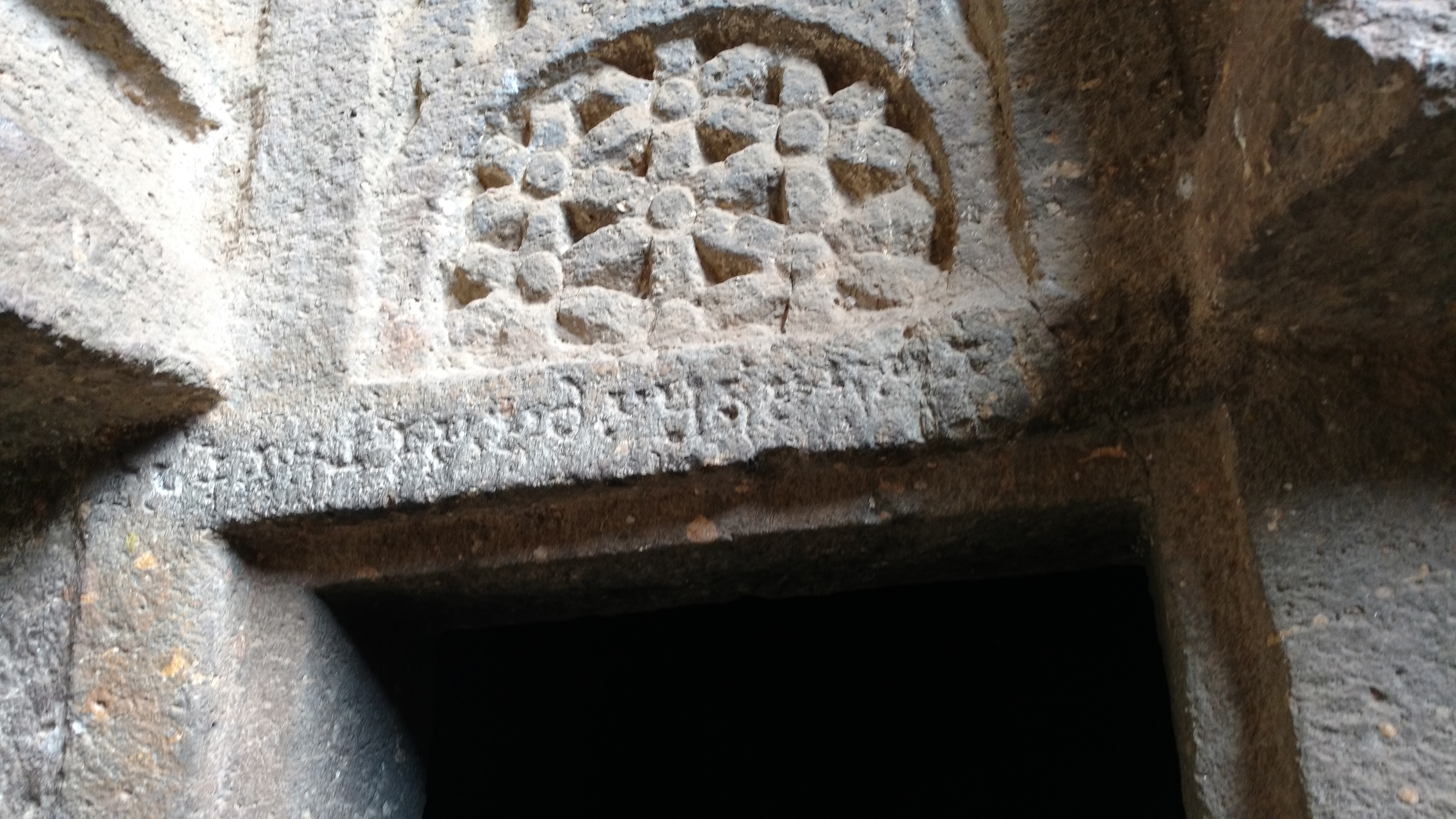
Inscription in Brahmi: Gift of Pushyanka, son of Ananda Sethi from Nashik

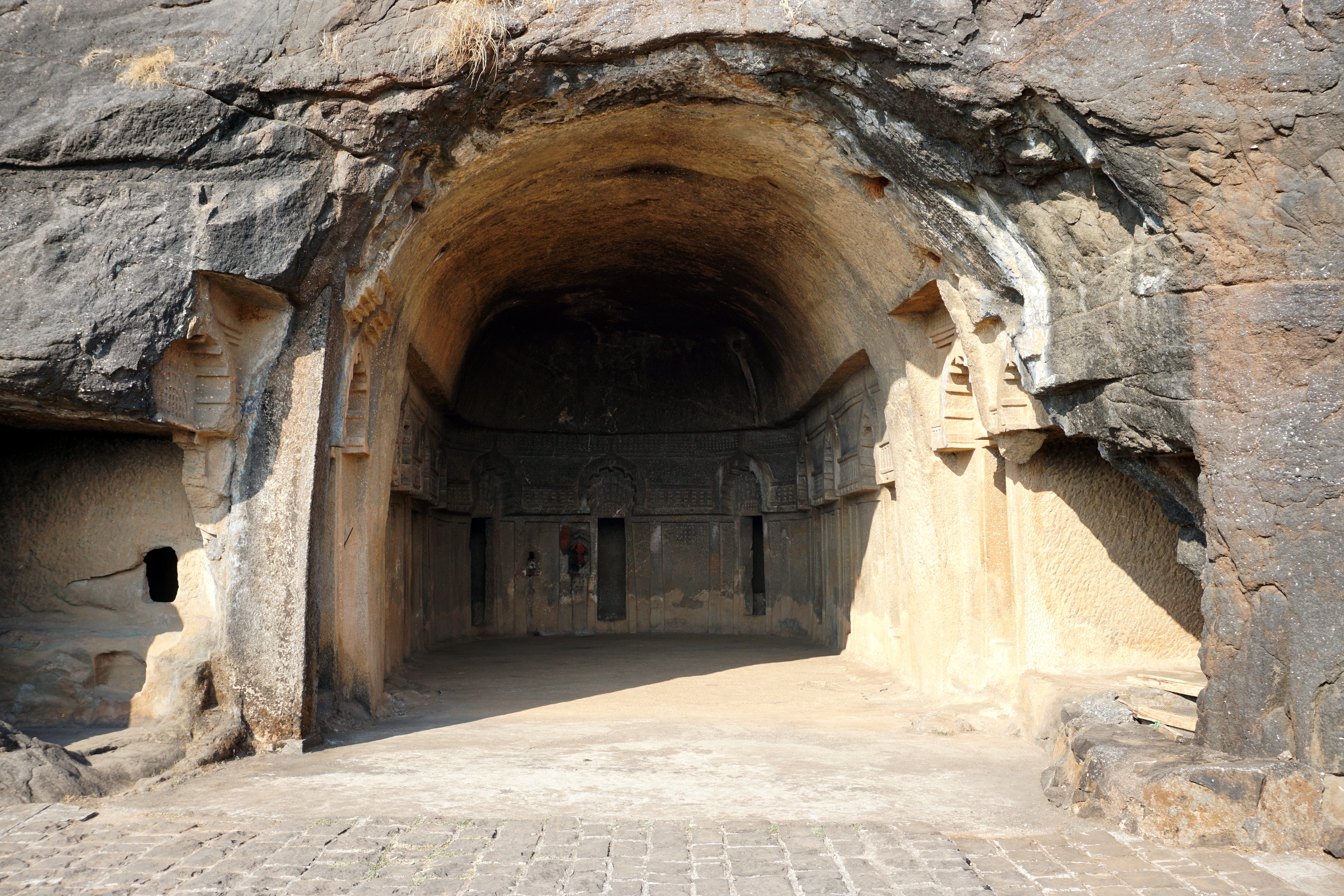
Main vihara

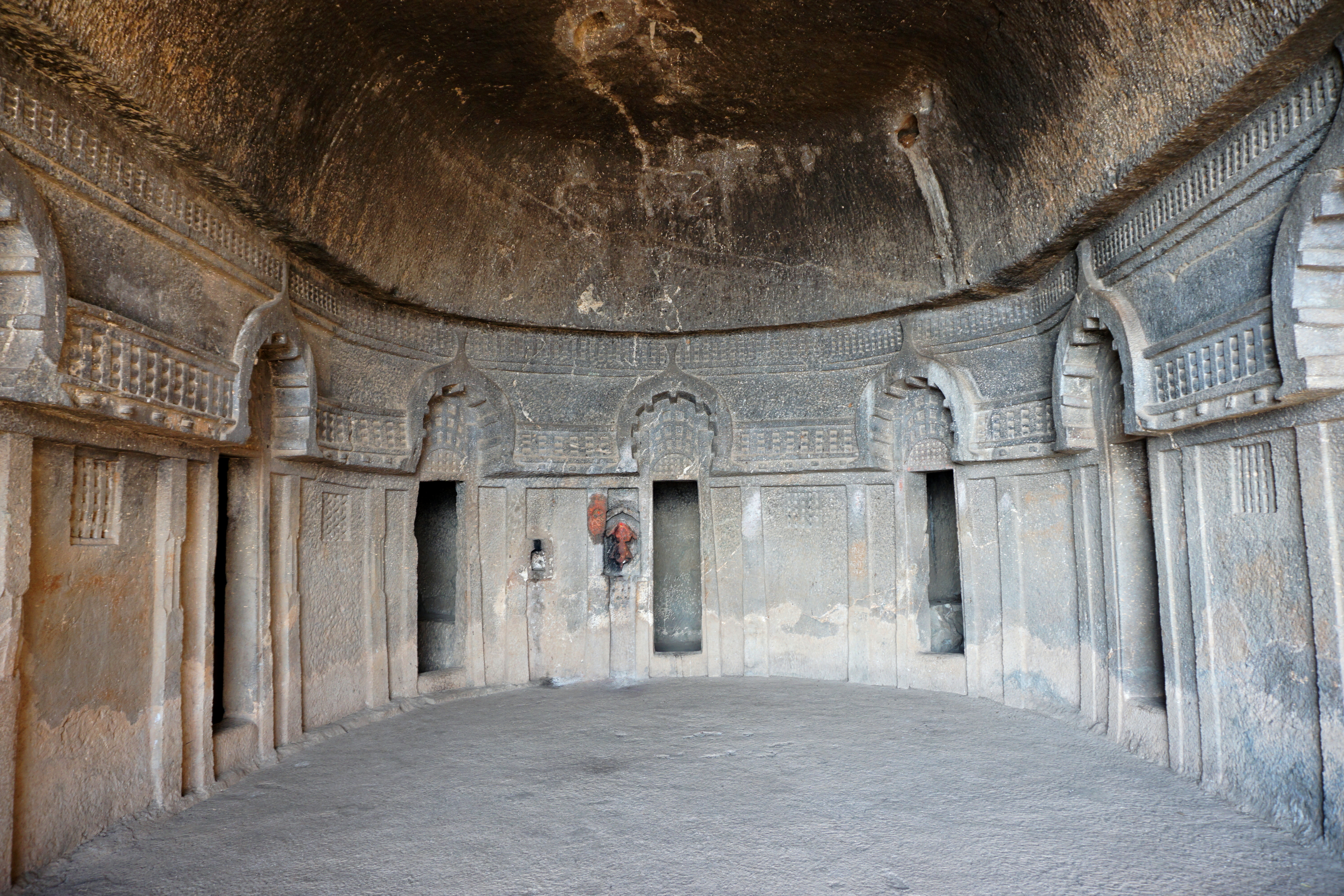
Inside the vihara

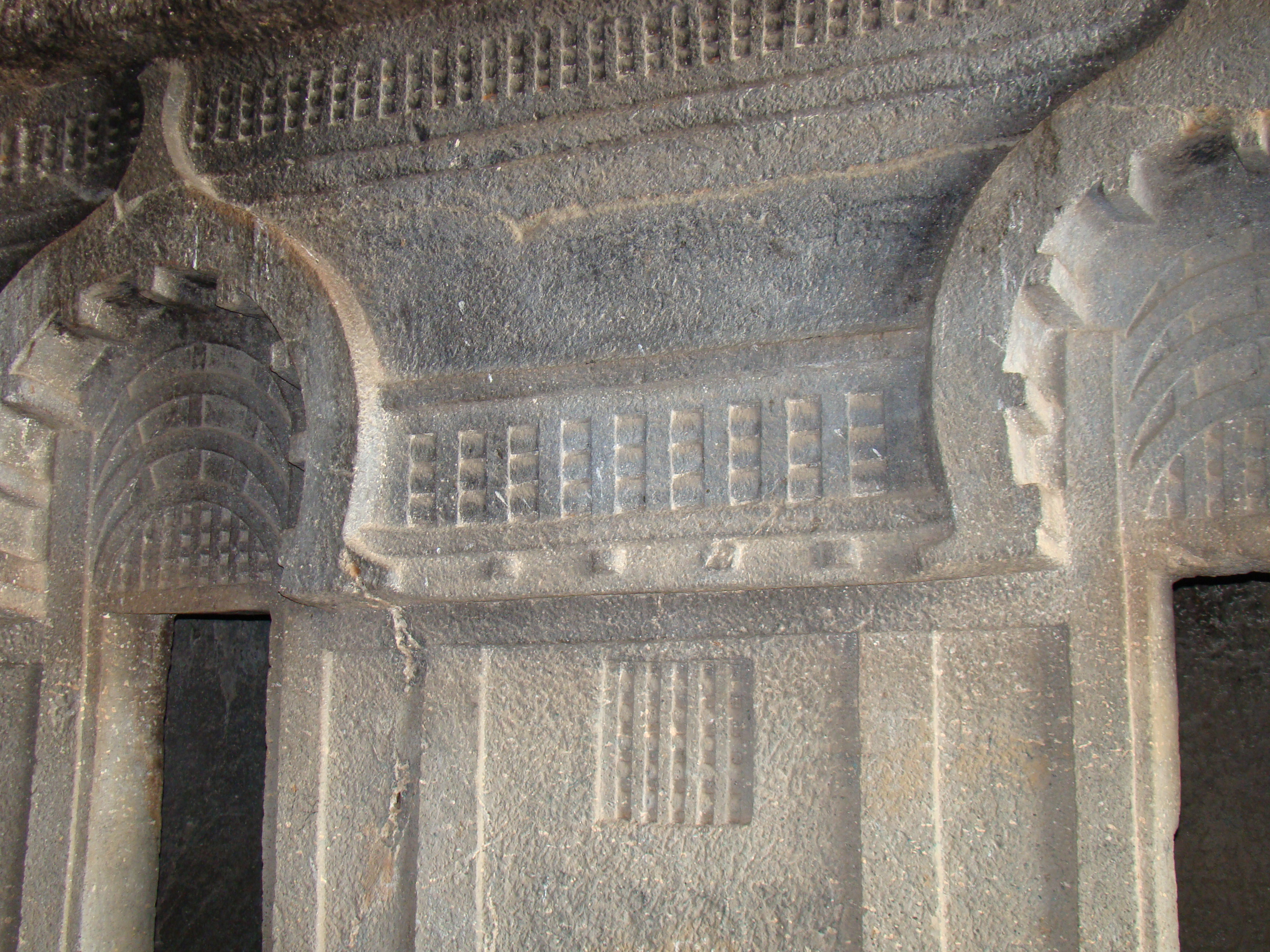
Cell doorways off the vihara

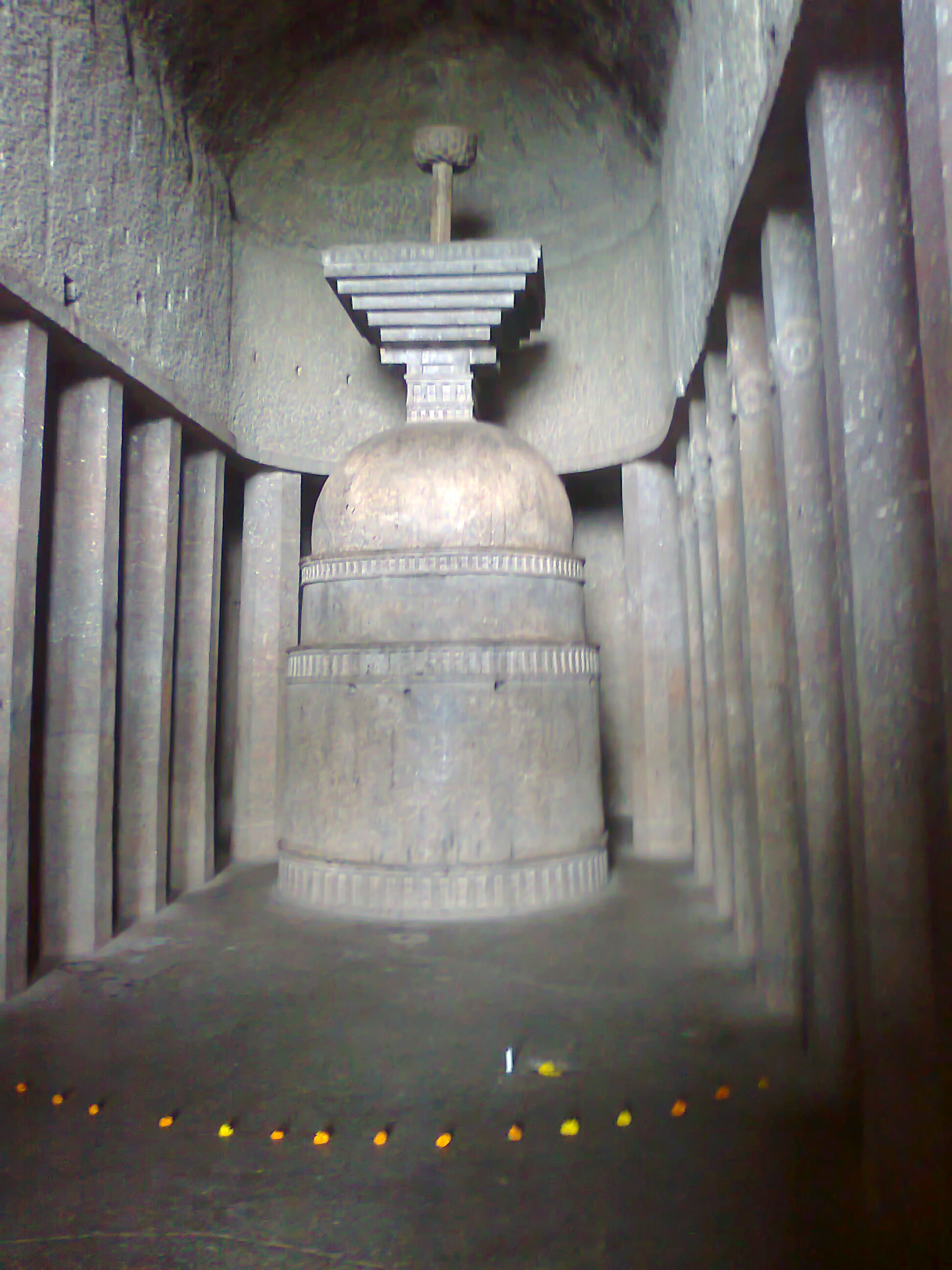
Bedsa caves
