= Kudos =

Kudos may refer to:

- Kudos (computer game), a life simulation game produced by Positech Games
- Kudos (production company), a UK-based film and television production company
- Kudos, a fictional currency used by the Dwellers in The Algebraist
- Kudos, the points system used in Metropolis Street Racer and the Project Gotham Racing video games
- Kudos, a 2018 sequel to Outline (novel) by Rachel Cusk
- Kudos, a feature of Archive of Our Own that allows readers to leave a story a "like"
- Kudos (granola bar), a brand of chocolate-covered cereal bar

== See also ==
- Kudoš, one of many rivers of Serbia
- Cudos (disambiguation)
- Kudus (disambiguation)
