= Bhaja Caves =

Cave complex in Maharashtra, India

Bhaje Caves
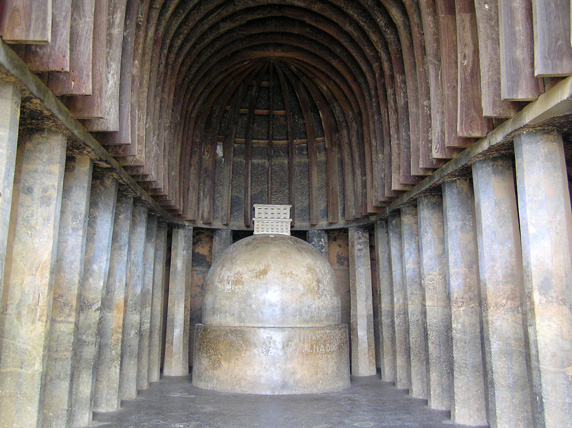
- Main Chaityagrha, Cave 12, with stupa

- Location within India
- Location: Pune, Bhaje, Maharashtra, India
- Coordinates: 18°43′40″N 73°28′55″E
- Geology: Basalt
- Entrances: 22
- Difficulty: easy
- Pronunciation: Bhaja or Bhaje

Bhaja Caves are a group of 22 rock-cut caves dating back to the 2nd century BC located off the Mumbai - Pune expressway near the city of Pune, India. The caves are 400 feet above the village of Bhaje, on an important ancient trade route running from the Arabian Sea eastward into the Deccan Plateau (the division between North India and South India). The inscriptions and the cave temple are protected as a Monument of National Importance, by the Archaeological Survey of India per Notification No. 2407-A. It belongs to the Early Buddhist schools in Maharashtra. The caves have a number of stupas, one of their significant features. The most prominent excavation is its chaitya (or chaityagrha – Cave XII), a good example of the early development of this form from wooden architecture, with a vaulted horseshoe ceiling. Its vihara (Cave XVIII) has a pillared verandah in front and is adorned with unique reliefs. These caves are notable for their indications of the awareness of wooden architecture. The carvings prove that tabla – a percussion instrument – was used in India for at least 2300 years, disproving the centuries-held belief that the tabla was introduced to India by outsiders or from Turko-Arab. The carving shows a woman playing tabla and another woman dancing.

They are some 9 km west from the Bedse Caves. Other caves in the area are Karla Caves, Patan Buddhist Cave and Nasik Caves.

== Architecture ==
The Bhaja Caves share architectural design with the Karla Caves. The most impressive monument is the large shrine — chaityagriha — with an open, horseshoe-arched entrance; according to the Archaeological Survey of India, the chaityagrha is the most prominent aspect of the caves, and one of the earliest of the type. The chaitya has unique reliefs from Indian mythology. Other caves have a nave and aisle, with an apse containing a solid tupa and the aisle circling round the apse, providing the circumambulation path.

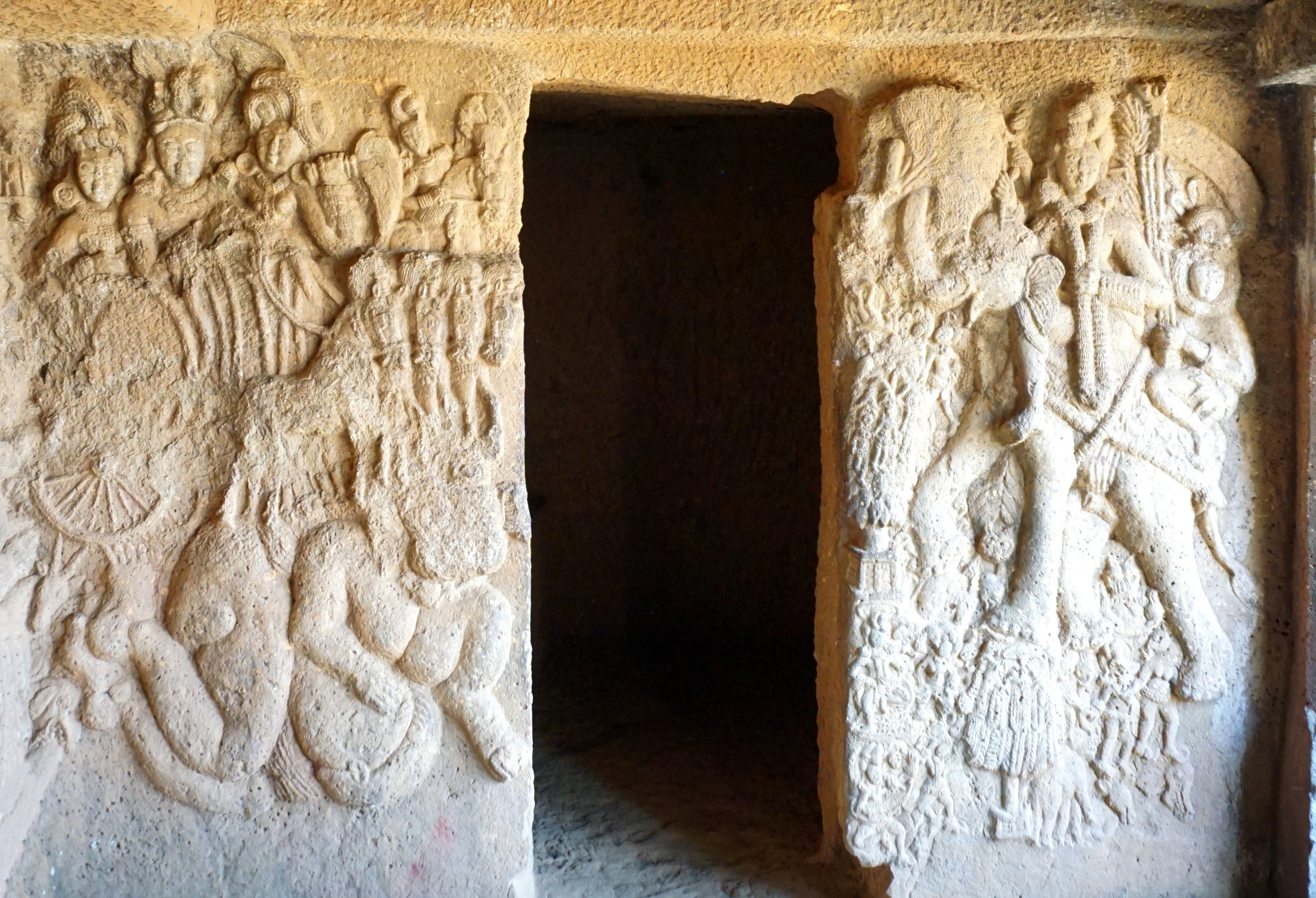
Sculptures of Surya (left) and Indra (right) at the entrance of the 1st century BCE Cave 19 at Bhaja Caves.

Chaitygraha has some Buddha images. A cistern inscription shows the name of a donor, Maharathi Kosikiputa Vihnudata, from the 2nd century AD. A wooden beam records two more inscriptions datable to the 2nd century B.C., which indicates caves have been there for at least 2200 years. Eight inscriptions are found in the caves, some giving the name of the donors.

The sculptures feature elaborate headdress, garlands, and jewellery; they might have originally been painted in bright colors but later covered with plaster. Characteristic for early Buddhism, initially the caves had symbolic Buddha representation. After 4 A.D. Buddha was painted in physical form as well.

Near the last cave is a waterfall that, during the monsoon season, flows water into a small pool at the bottom.

== Musical Instruments ==
These caves also provide important proof regarding the history of the Tabla, or Pushkara then called; an Indian percussion instrument, since carvings from 200 BCE show a woman playing tabl and another performing a dance.

== Stupas ==
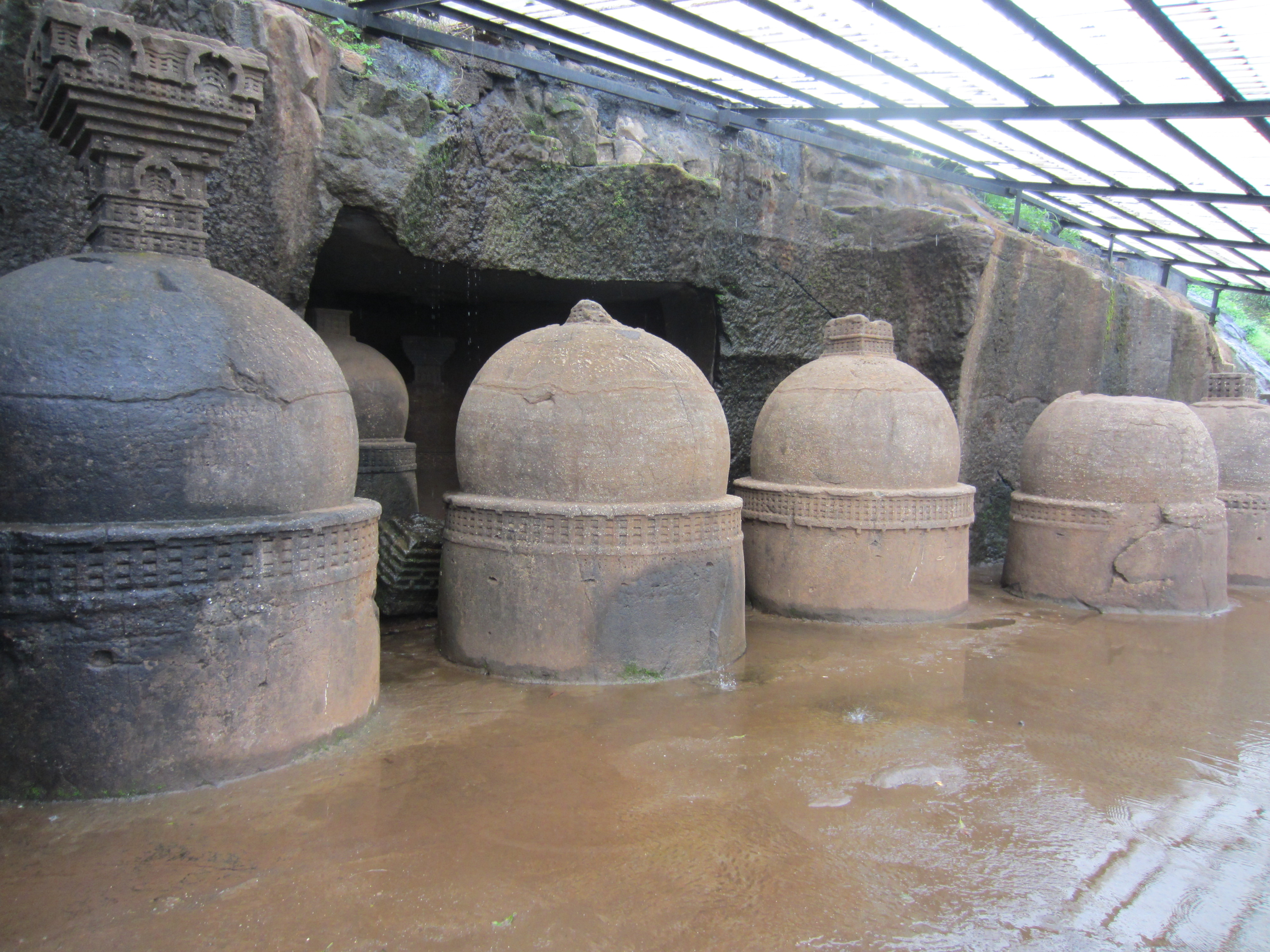
Outside stupas

A notable part of the monument is a group of 14 stupas, five inside and nine outside an irregular excavation. The stupas are relics of resident monks, who died at Bhaja, and display an inscription with the names of three monks, Ampinika, Dhammagiri and Sanghdina. One of the stupas has inscribed upon it Stavirana Bhadanta, which means the venerable reverend. The stupa particulars show the name of the monks and their respective titles. The stupas have been carved very elaborately and two of them have a relic box on their upper side. Names of monks have been titled with Theras.

== Caves ==
- Cave VI

It is irregular vihara, 14 feet square, has two cells on each side and three on back side. The chaitya window is ornamental all over cell doors. Ploughman's wife, Bodhi, gifted this Vihara as her name is inscribed on cell door.

- Cave IX

Rail pattern ornament, broken animal figures, verandah is on frontal side. It is similar to Cave VIII at Pandavleni Caves.

- Cave XII

The chaitya at Bhaja Caves is perhaps the earliest surviving chaitya hall, constructed in the second century BCE. It consists of an apsidal hall with stupa. The columns slope inwards in the imitation of wooden columns that would have been structurally necessary to keep a roof up. The ceiling is barrel vaulted with ancient wooden ribs set into them. The walls are polished in the Mauryan style. It was faced by a substantial wooden facade, now entirely lost. A large horseshoe-shaped window, the chaitya-window, was set above the arched doorway and the whole portico-area was carved to imitate a multi-storeyed building with balconies and windows and sculptured men and women who observed the scene below. This created the appearance of an ancient Indian mansion.

Chaitya is 26 feet 8 inches wide and 59 feet long, with semi-circular apse at back, and having aisle 3 feet 5 inches wide, separated from the nave by 27 octagonal shafts which are 11 feet 4 inches height. The dagoba is 11 feet diameter at the floor. This resembles the Kondana Caves. The pillar has 7 different symbols of Buddha shown in floral form, buds, leaves, fan.

Cave XII "Main Chaitya"
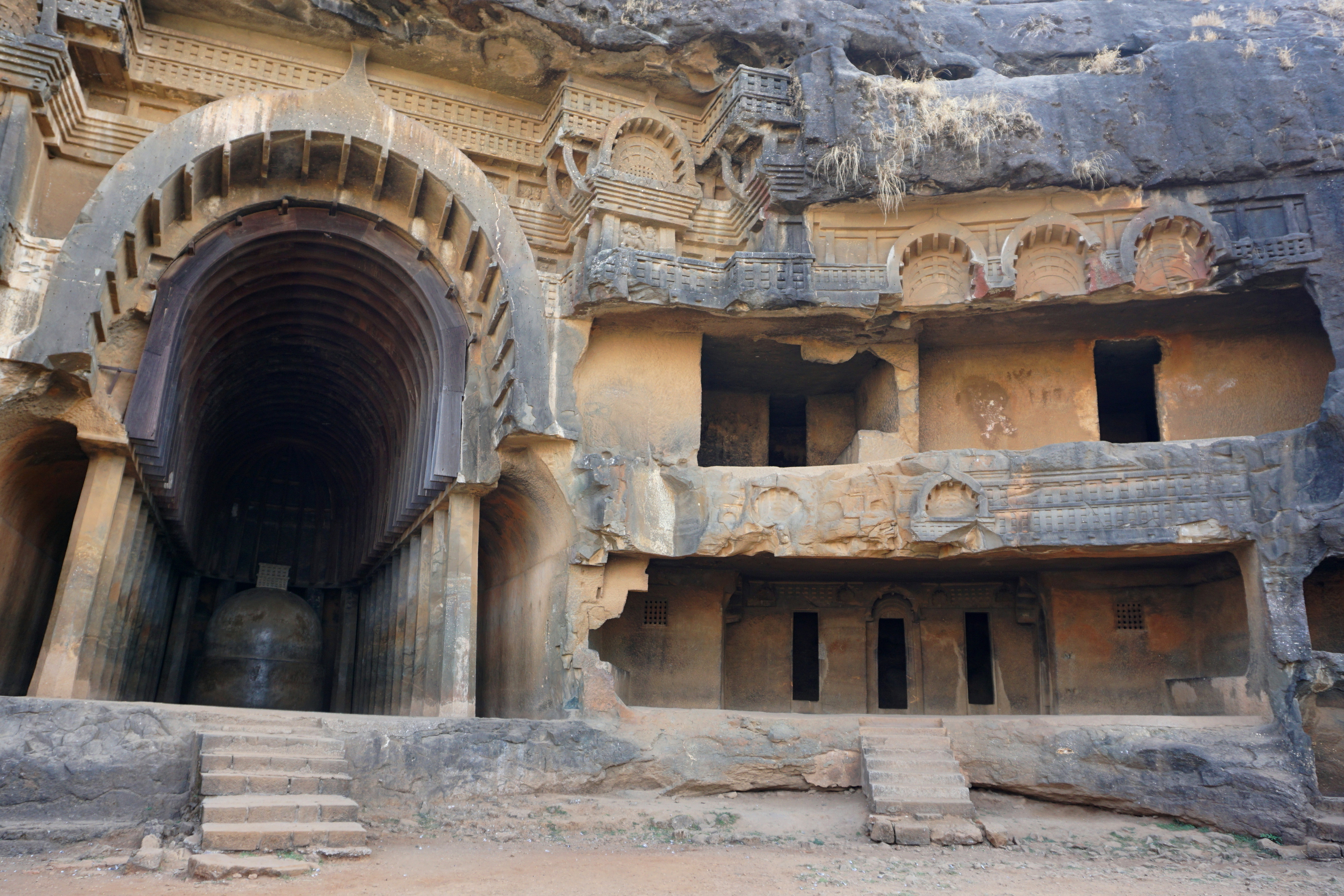
Setting of the entrance

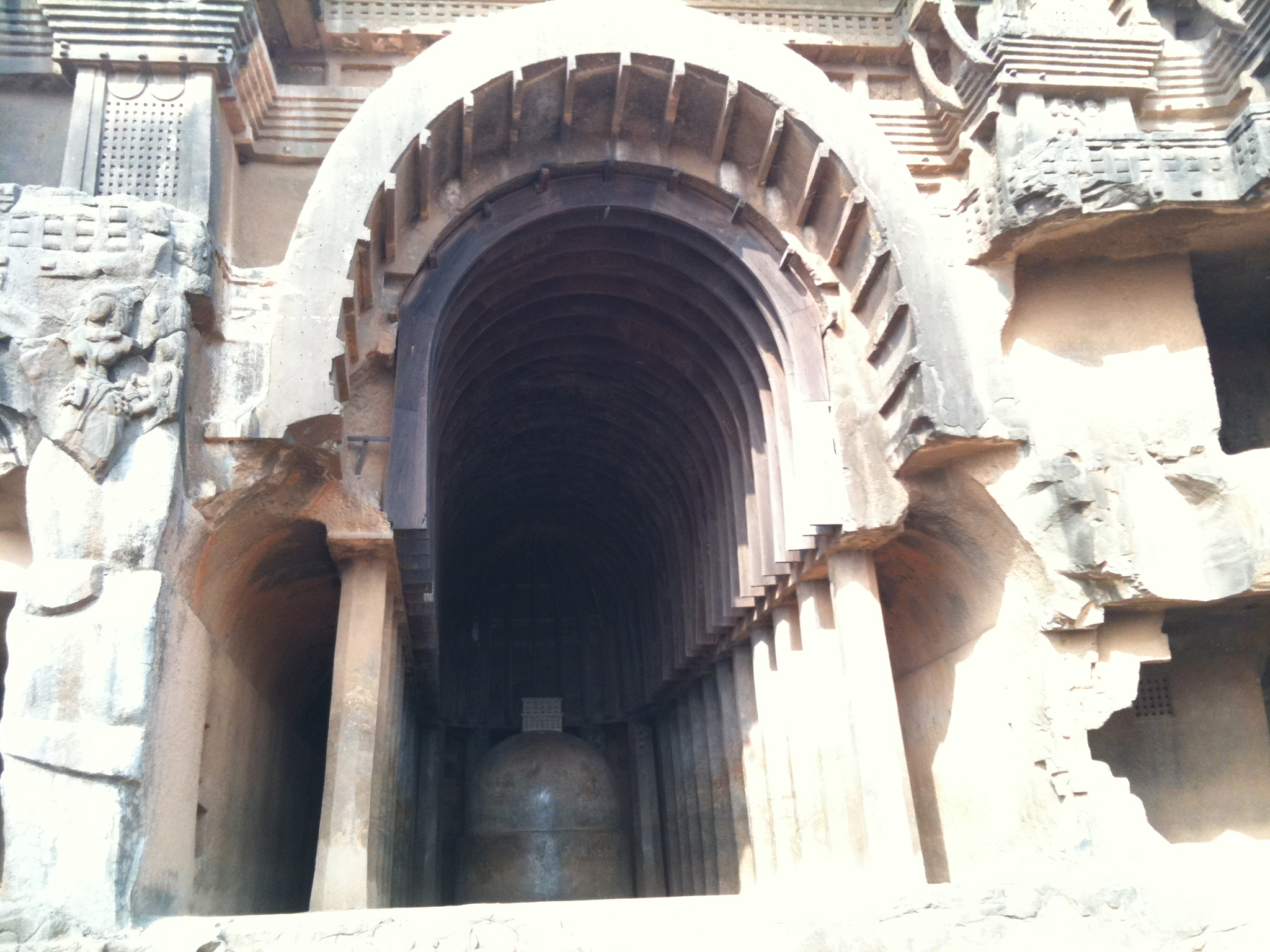
Exterior

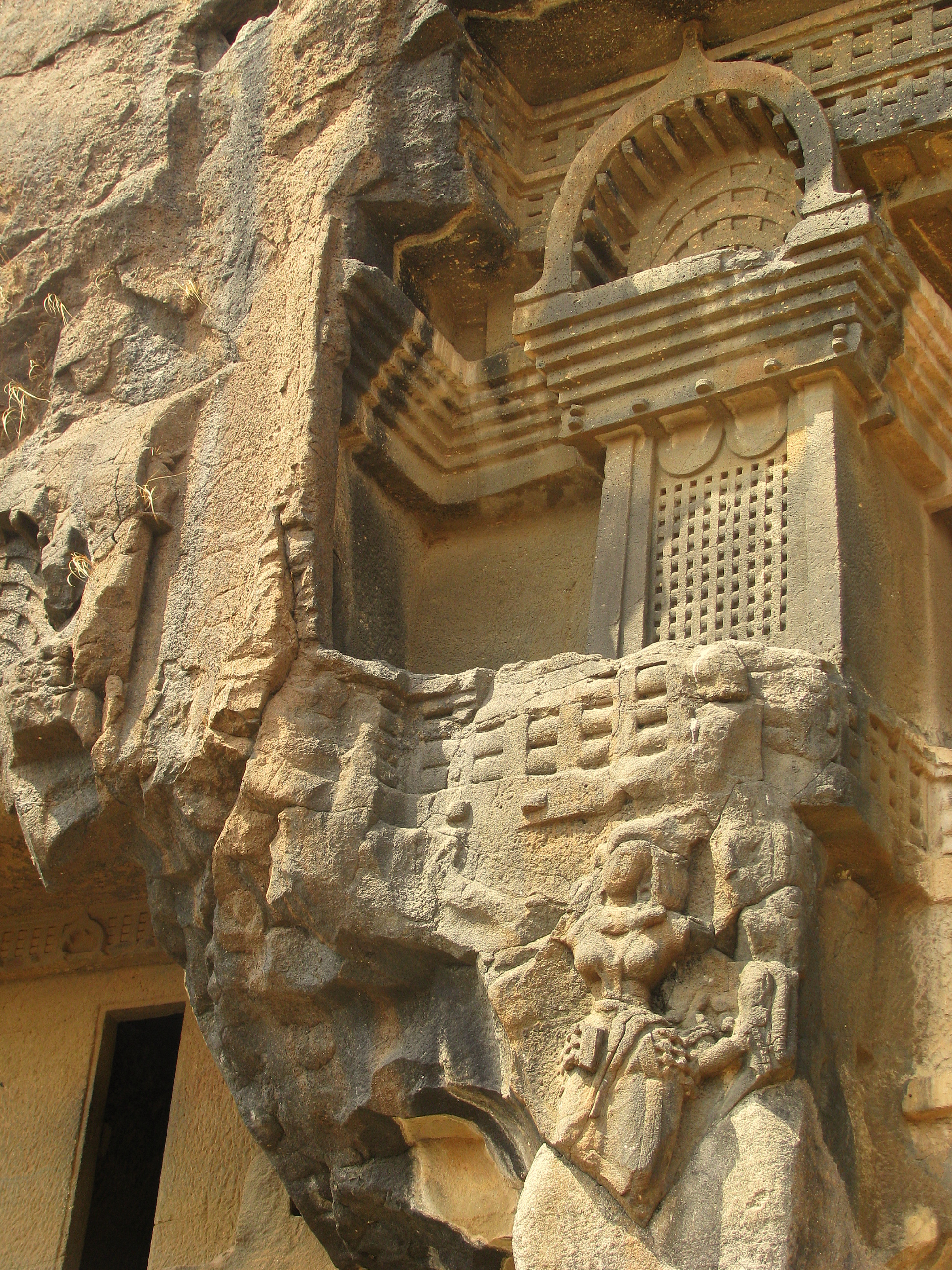
Facade of the chaitya

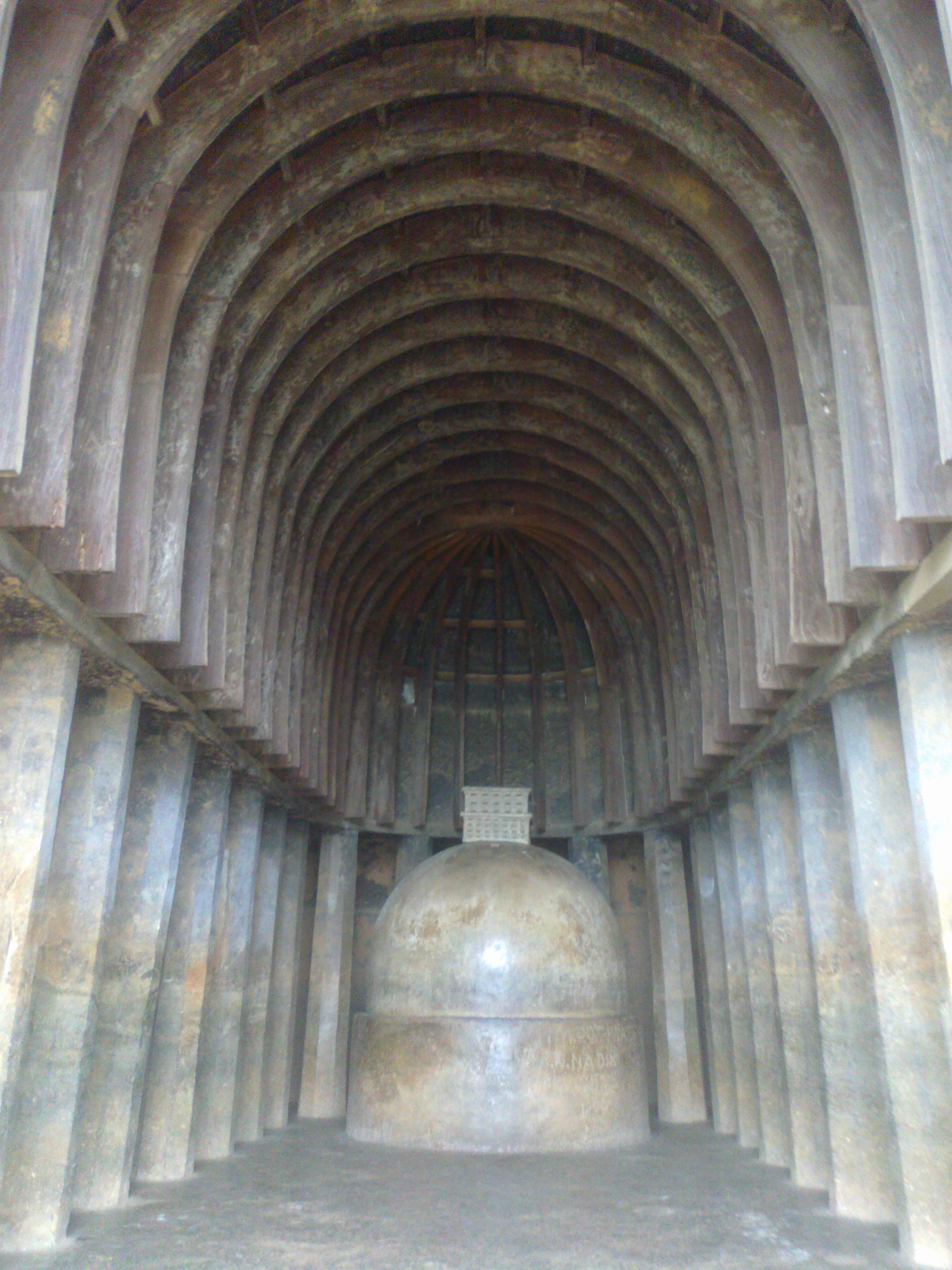
Chaityagruha at Bhaja Caves

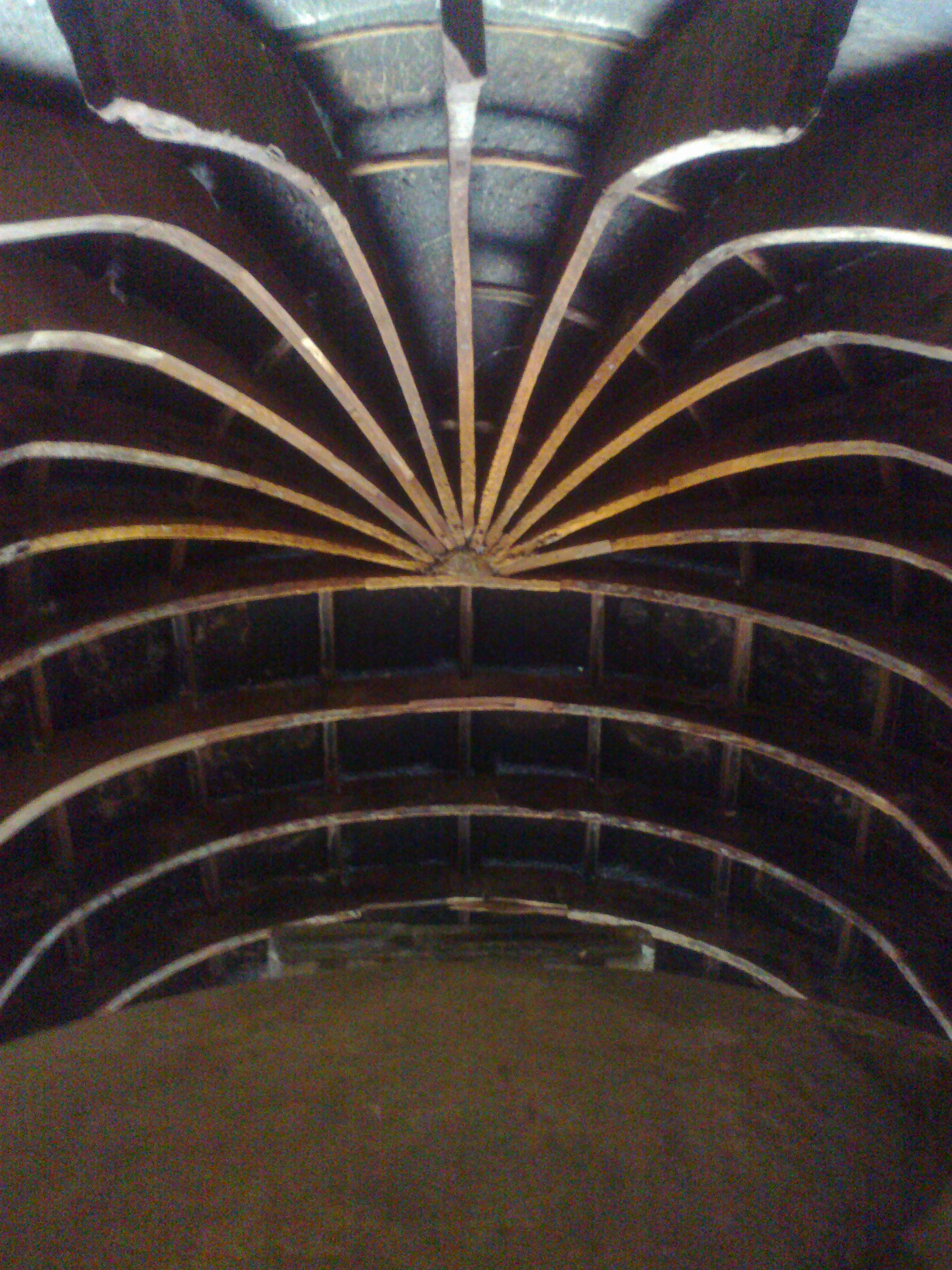
Wooden Ceiling in Main Chaitygruha

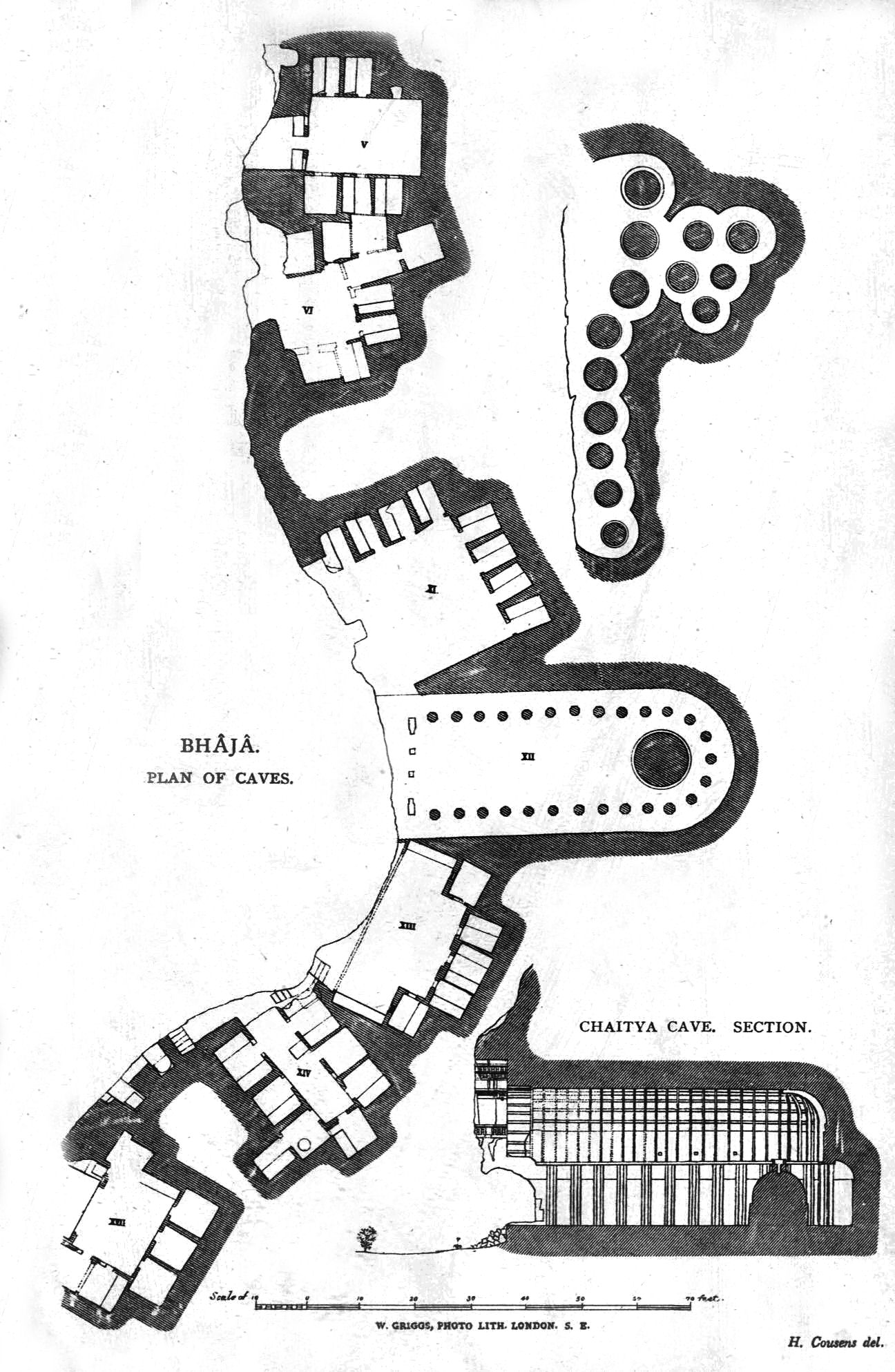
Plan of the site

- Cave XIII

This seems to be destroyed. It may have been of wood construction in ancient times. It is 30 feet long and 14.5 feet deep. It is in a rail pattern, with a few cells at the back and a bolt door system.

- Cave XIV

This cave is facing towards northern side 6 feet 8 inches wide and 25.5 feet deep, with 7 cells. Stone benches, square windows, stone beds—are observed in the cells.

- Cave XV

It can be reached by stairs to the south of Cave XIV. It is a small vihara 12.5 wide and 10 feet deep. It has two semi-circular niches and a bench on right side.

- Cave XVI

This façade has 3 Chaitya arches and the rail pattern.

- Cave XVII

It is a small vihara 18.5 feet long and 12.5 deep, with 5 cells, one of the cell has a bench in it. It has two inscriptions, one of which is damaged. Cell door inscription describes "the gift of cell from Nadasava, a Naya of Bhogwati." One more inscription over two wells in one recess describes "a religious gift of cistern by Vinhudata, son of Kosiki, a great warrior."

- Cave XIX

It is a monastery with a verandah. The door has guardian figures on both sides. This cave has Surya riding a chariot and Indra riding on an elephant.

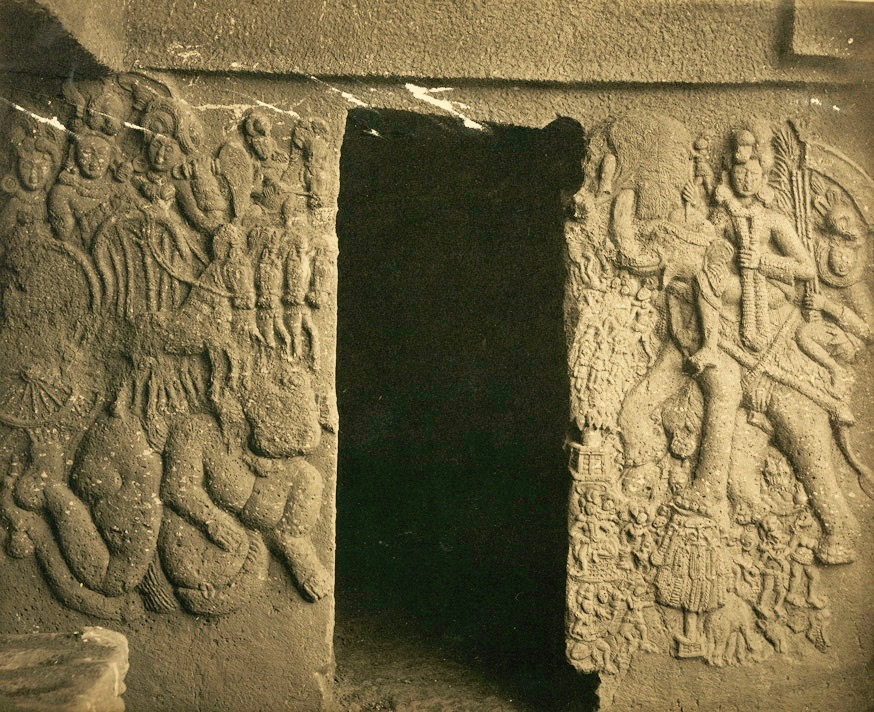
Satvahana protecting the entrance of a cave. Bhaja Caves.

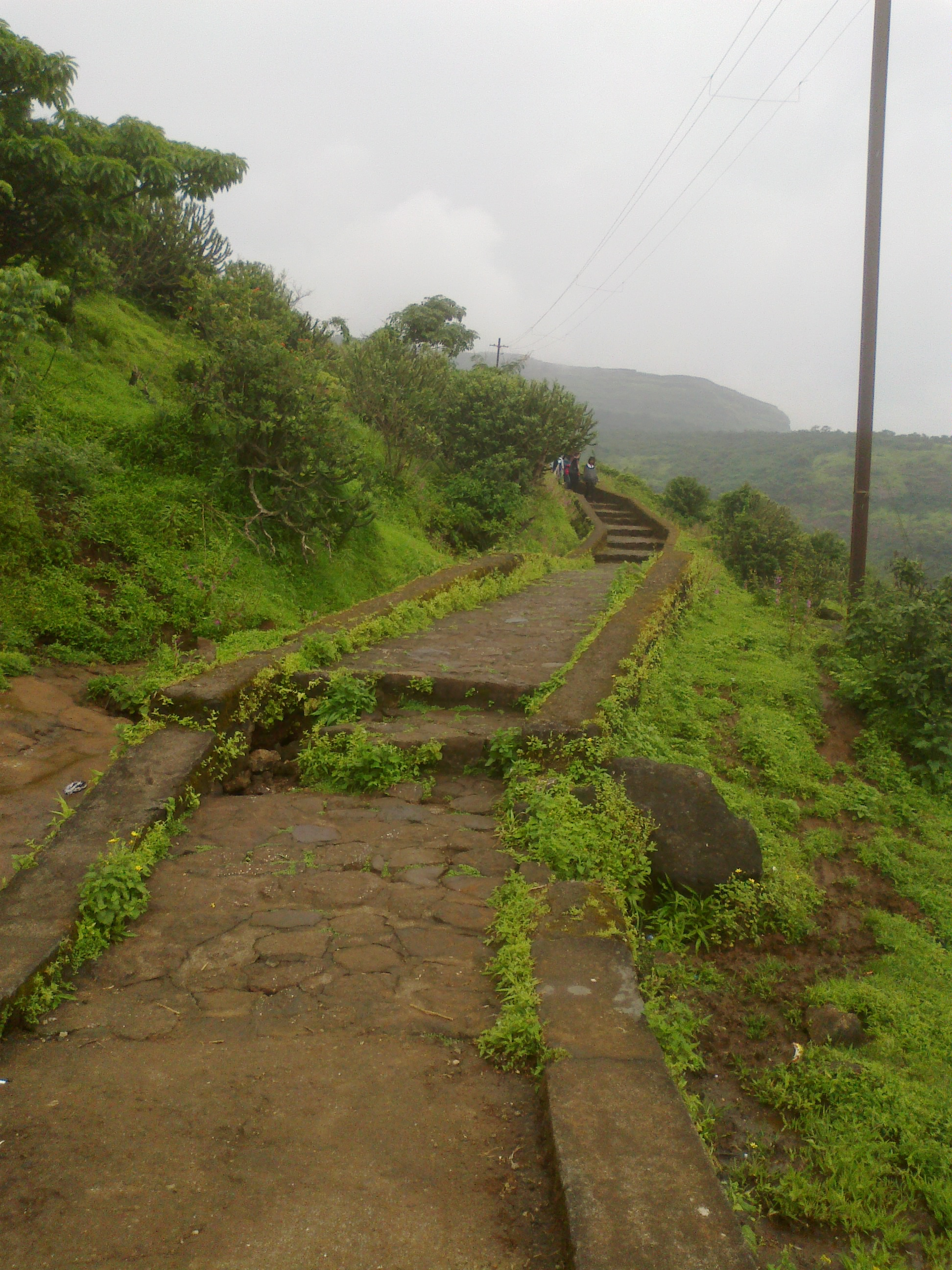
Stairways to Bhaja Caves

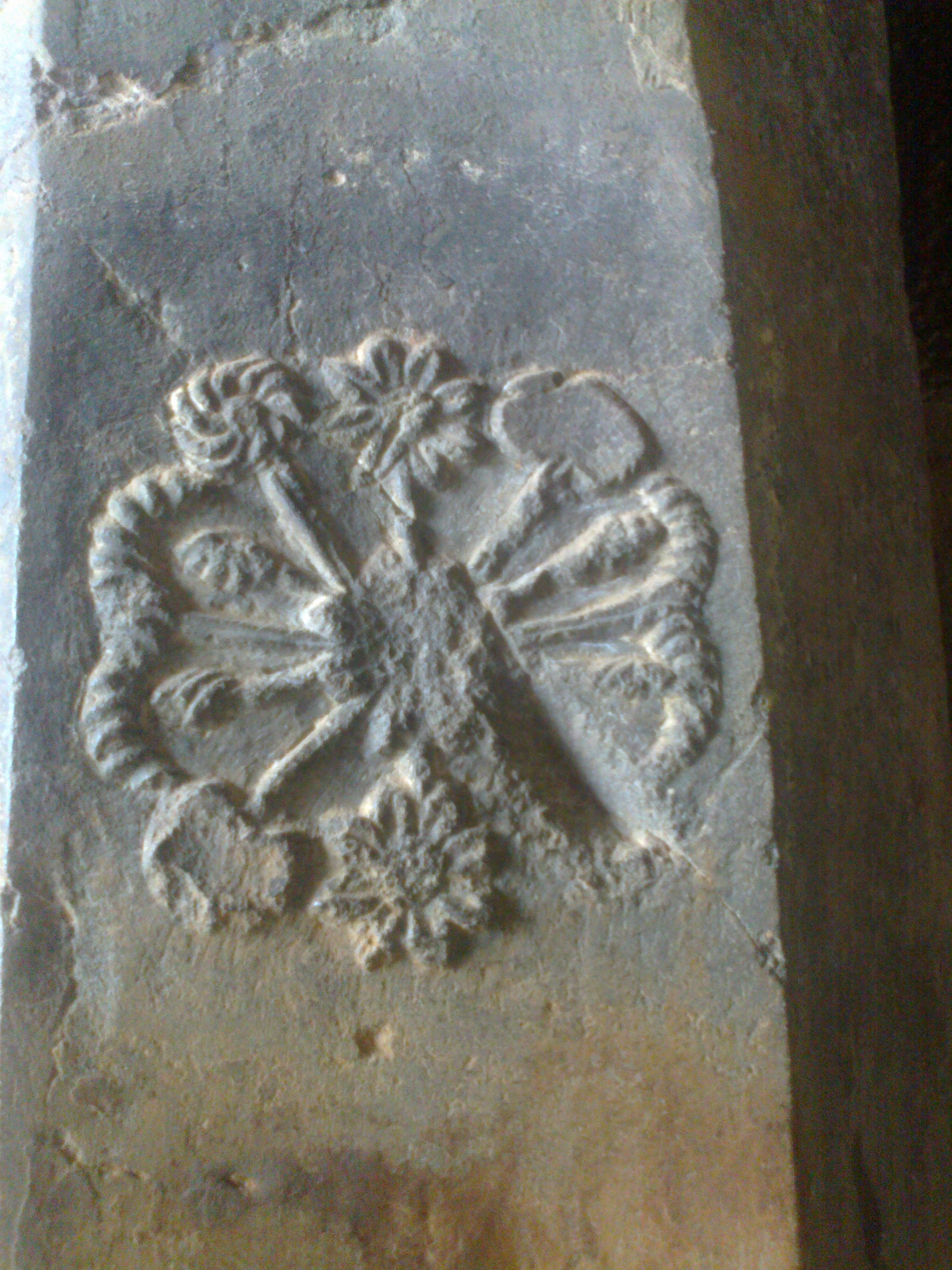
Carvings at Bhaja Caves

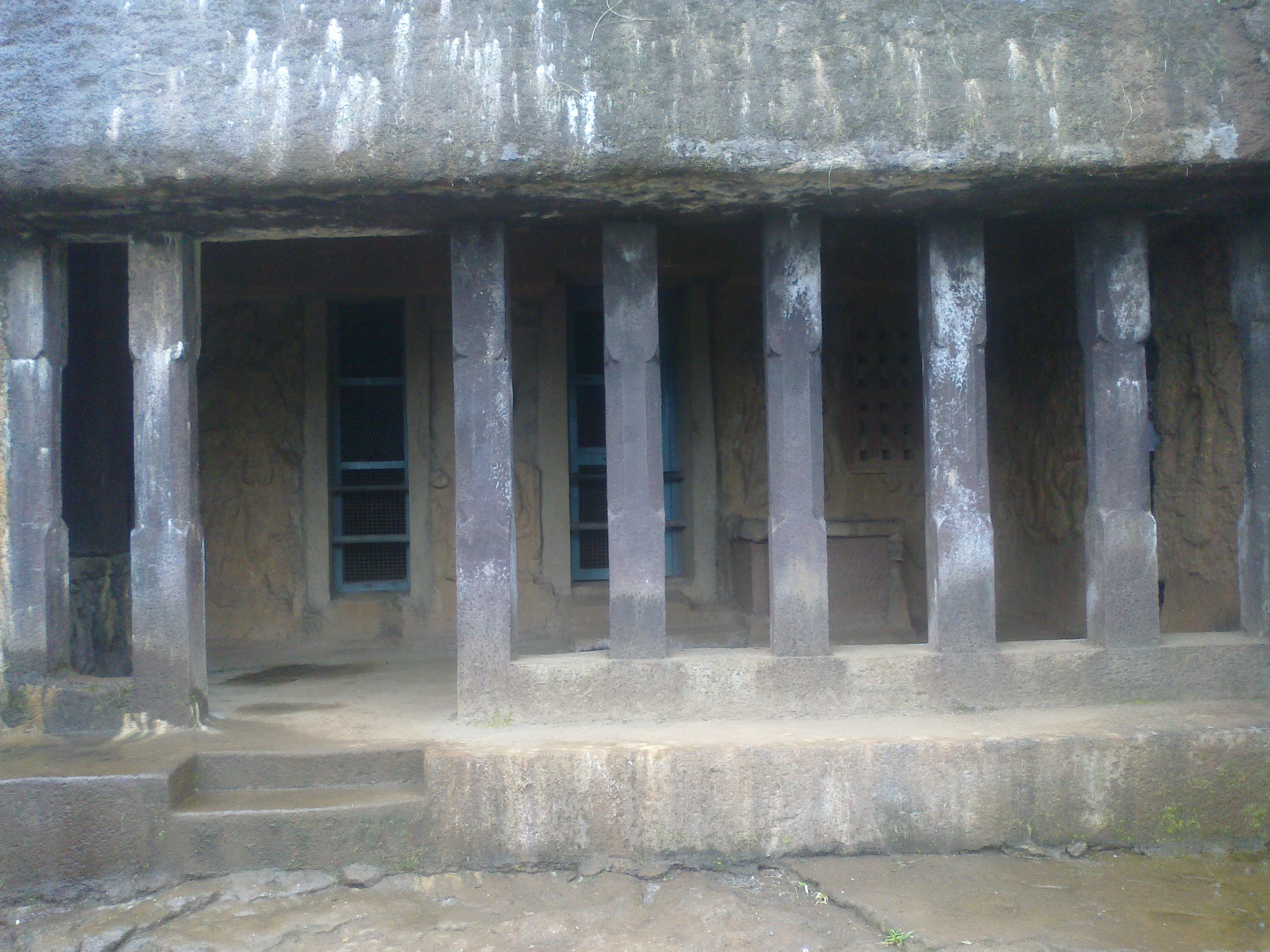
Bhaja Caves

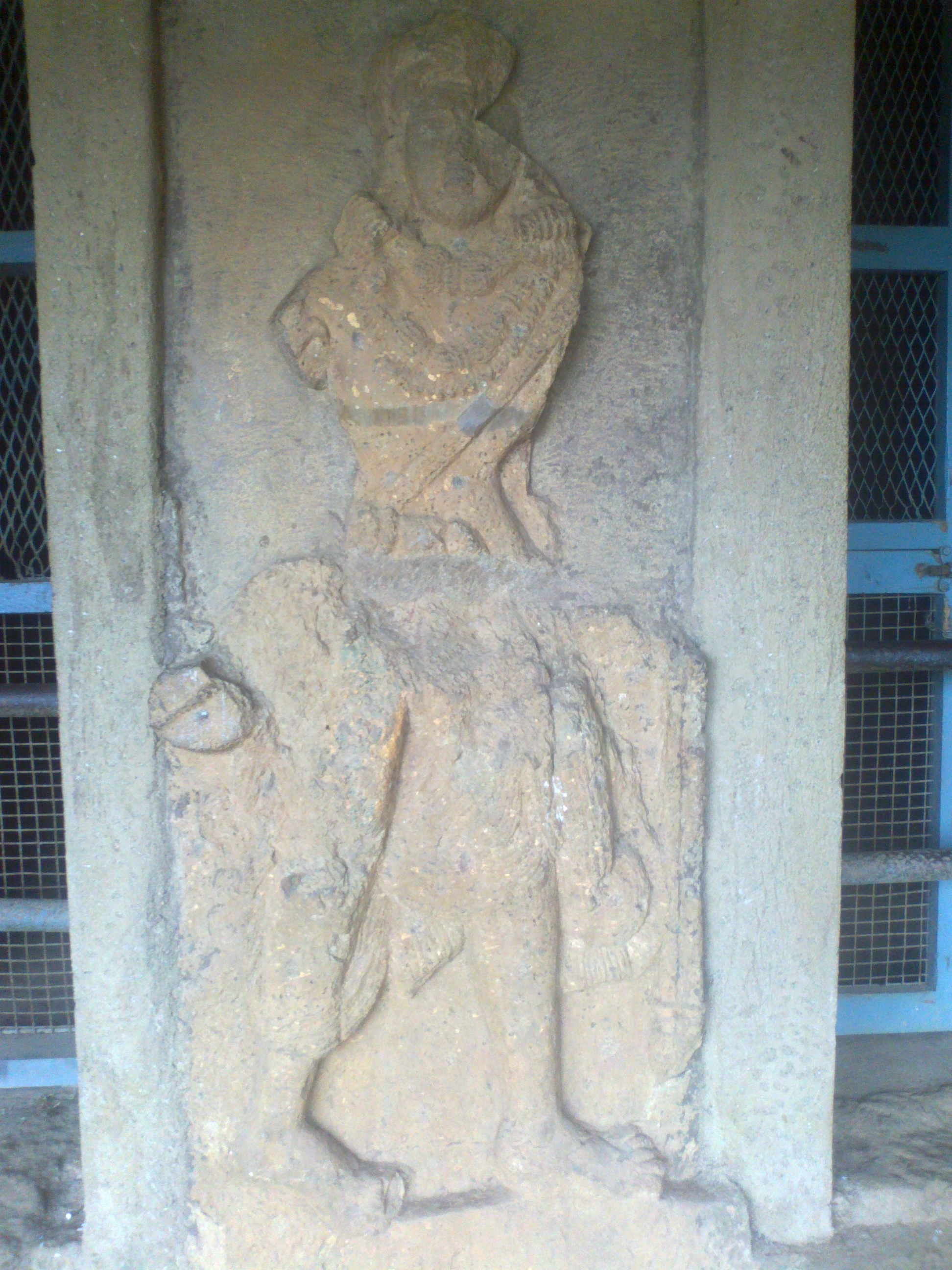
Carvings at Bhaja Caves

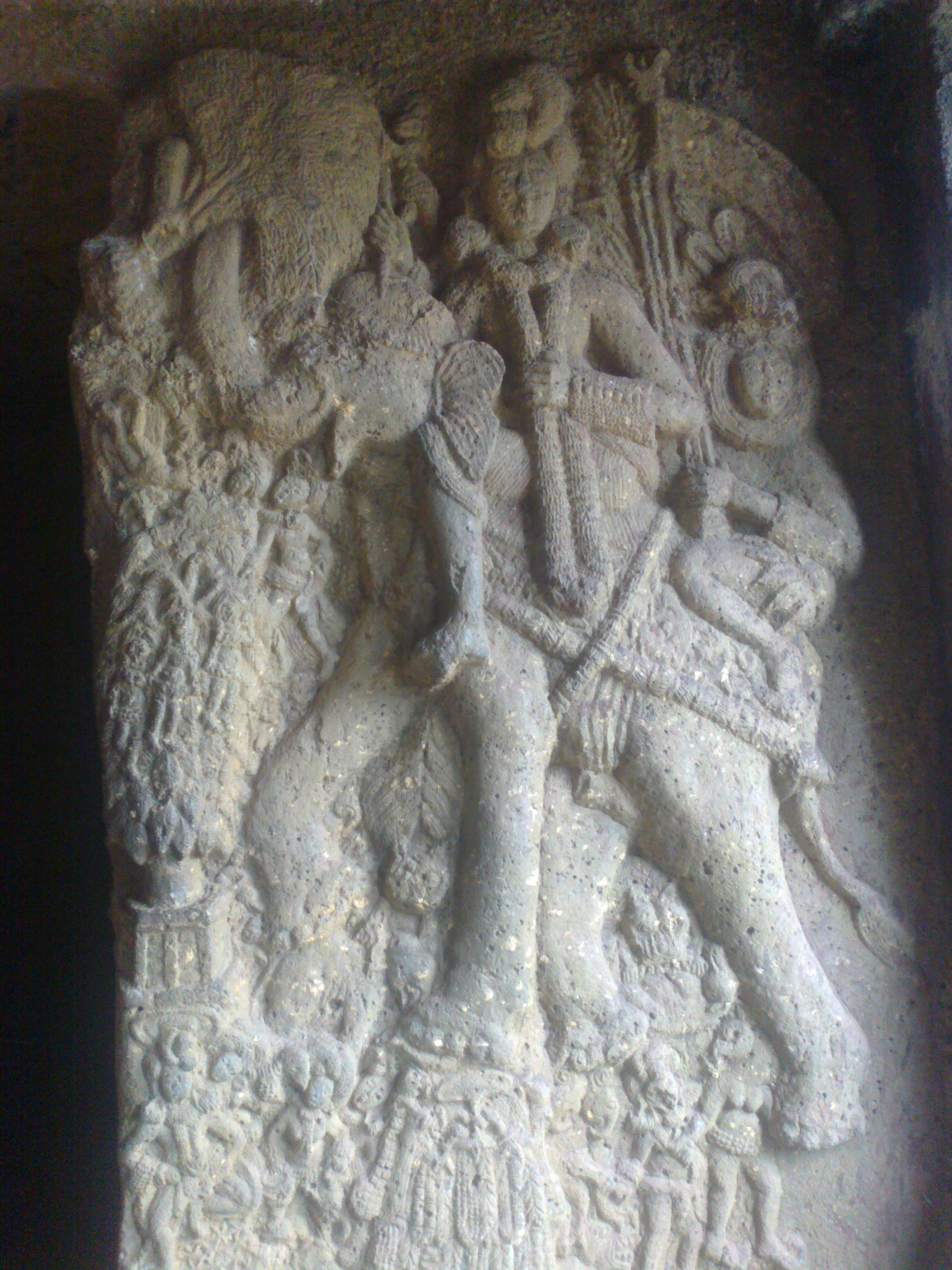
Carvings at Bhaja Caves

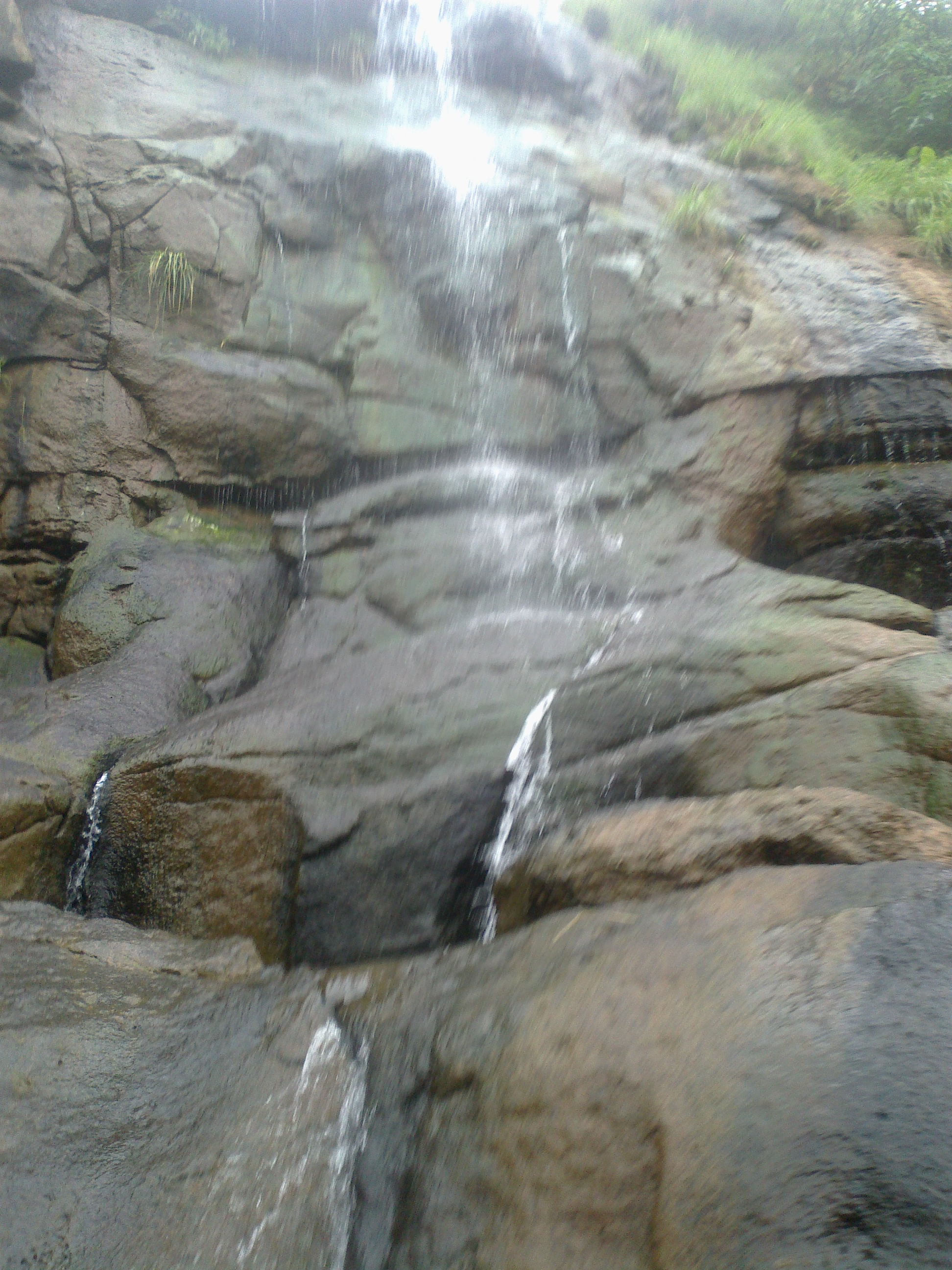
Waterfall at Bhaja Caves

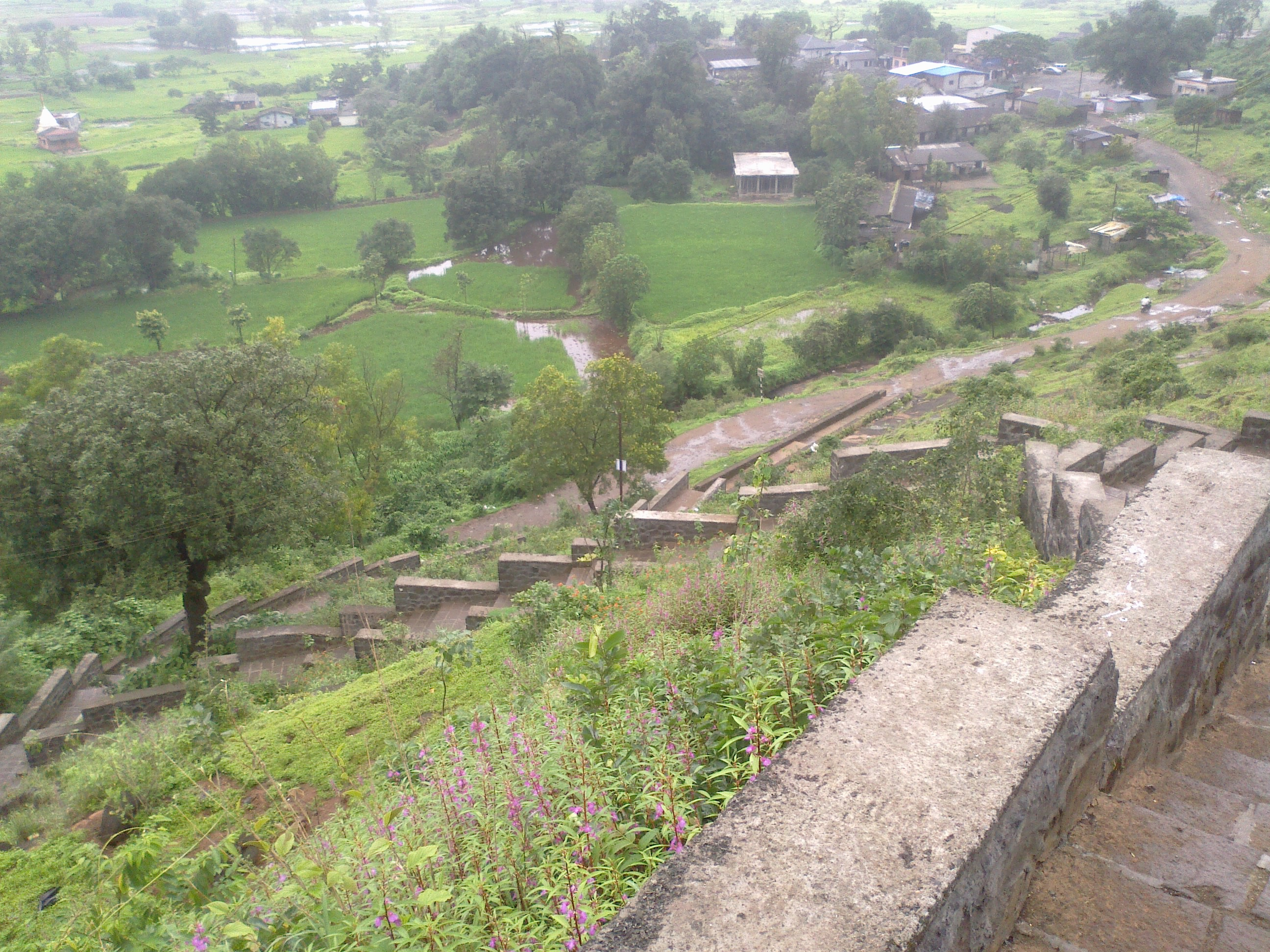
Stairways to Bhaja Caves

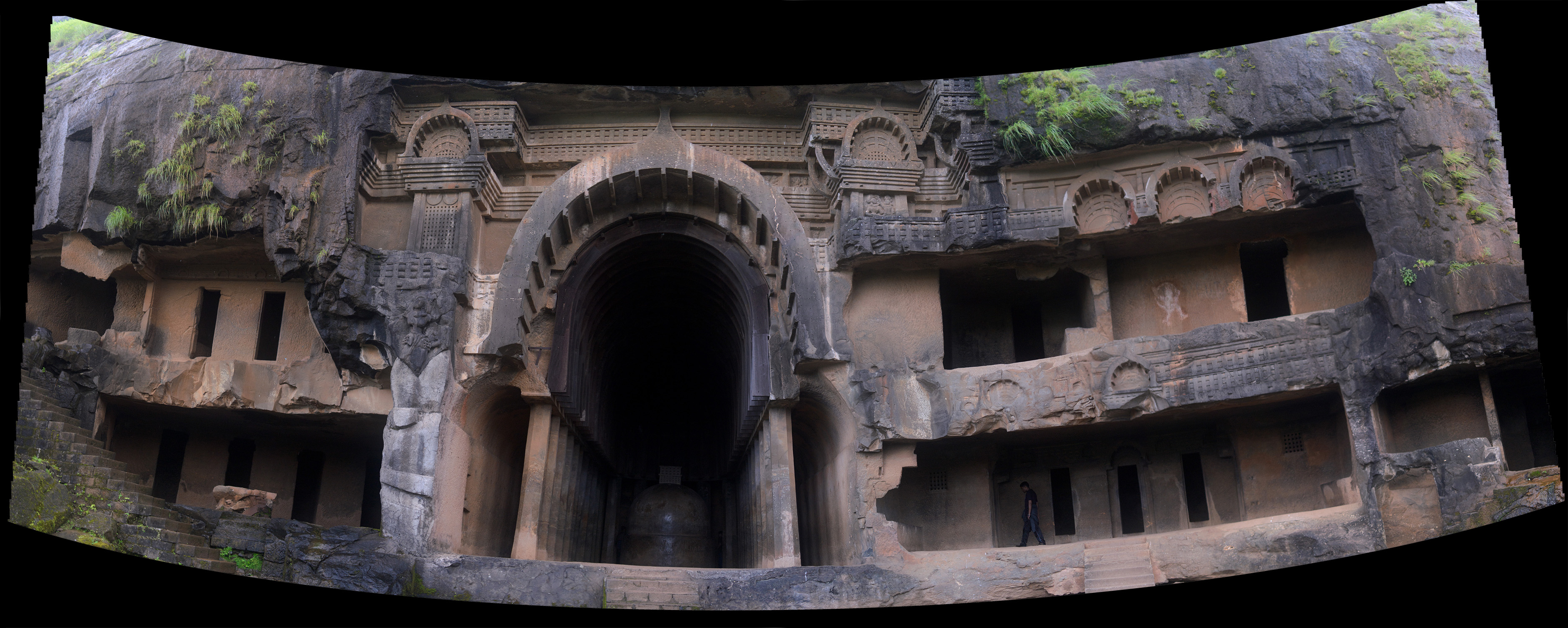
Panorama Bhaja Caves
