= Karla Caves =

Ancient Buddhist caves in India

Coordinates: 18°47′00″N 73°28′14″E

Karla Cave
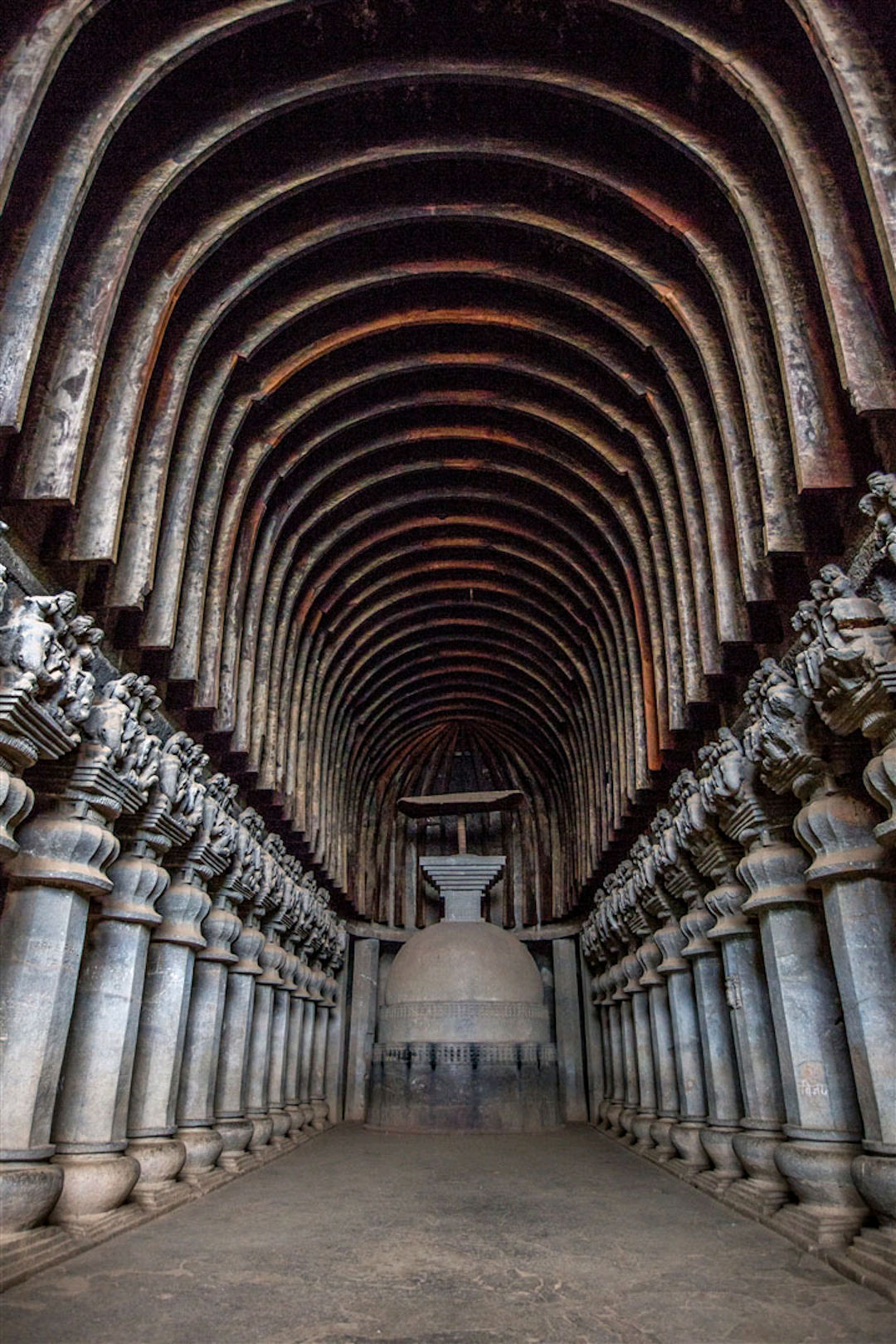
- The Great Chaitya in the Karla Caves, Maharashtra, built in 50-70 CE

- Location within India
- Location: Karli, India
- Geology: Basalt

The Karla Caves, Karli Caves, Karle Caves or Karla Cells, are a complex of ancient Buddhist Indian rock-cut caves at Karli near Lonavala, Maharashtra. It is just 10.9 Kilometers away from Lonavala. Other caves in the area are Bhaja Caves, Patan Buddhist Cave, Bedse Caves and Nasik Caves. The shrines were developed over the period from the 2nd century BCE to the 5th century CE. The oldest of the cave shrines is believed to date back to 160 BCE, having arisen near a major ancient trade route, running eastward from the Arabian Sea into the Deccan.

The group at Karla is one of the older and smaller of the many rock-cut Buddhist sites in Maharashtra. It is one of the best-known because of the famous "Grand Chaitya" (Cave 8), the largest and most completely preserved chaitya hall of the period, containing unusual quantities of fine sculpture on a large scale.

Many traders, Western Satraps of Saka origin and Satavahana rulers made grants for construction and support of these caves. Karla's location in Maharashtra places it in a region that marks the division between North India and South India. Buddhists, having become identified with commerce and manufacturing through their early association with traders, tended to locate their monastic establishments in natural geographic formations close to major trade routes so as to provide lodging houses for travelling traders. Today, the cave complex is a protected monument under the Archaeological Survey of India.

== Affiliation ==
The caves were historically associated with the Mahāsāṃghika sect of Buddhism which had great popularity in this region of India, as well as wealthy patronage. The caves house a Buddhist monastery dating back to the 2nd century BC. The monastery was once home to two 15-meter grand pillars outside the chaitya. Now only one of these remains, and the remaining space is occupied by a temple dedicated to the goddess Ekveera, who is worshipped most notably by the Aagri and Koli community of Mumbai.

== Architecture ==
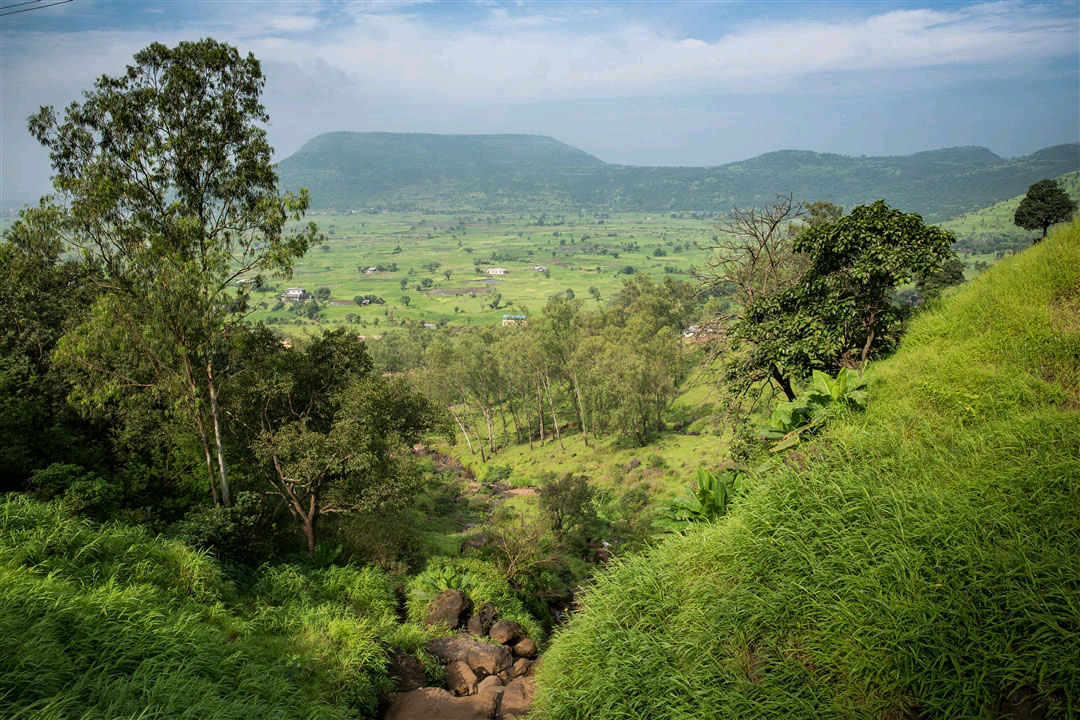
Path to the Karla Caves.

The Karla cave complex is built into a rocky hillside around 60 kilometres (37 mi) from Pune, with large windows cut into the rock to light the cave interiors. The caves are among a large numbers of similar caves excavated in the Sahyadri Hills in the early 1st millennium CE. There are altogether 16 caves in the group, with 3 of them being Mahayana caves. Most of the caves are lenas, with the major exception being the Great Chaitya, Cave No. 8.

=== Great Chaitya cave ===
The main cave, called the Great Chaitya cave, or Cave No. 8, features a large, intricately carved chaitya within a prayer hall, dating back to 50-70 CE. This is the largest rock-cut chaitya in India, measuring 45 metres (148 ft) long and up to 14 metres (46 ft) high. The hall features sculptures of both males and females, as well as animals such as lions and elephants.

==== Patrons ====
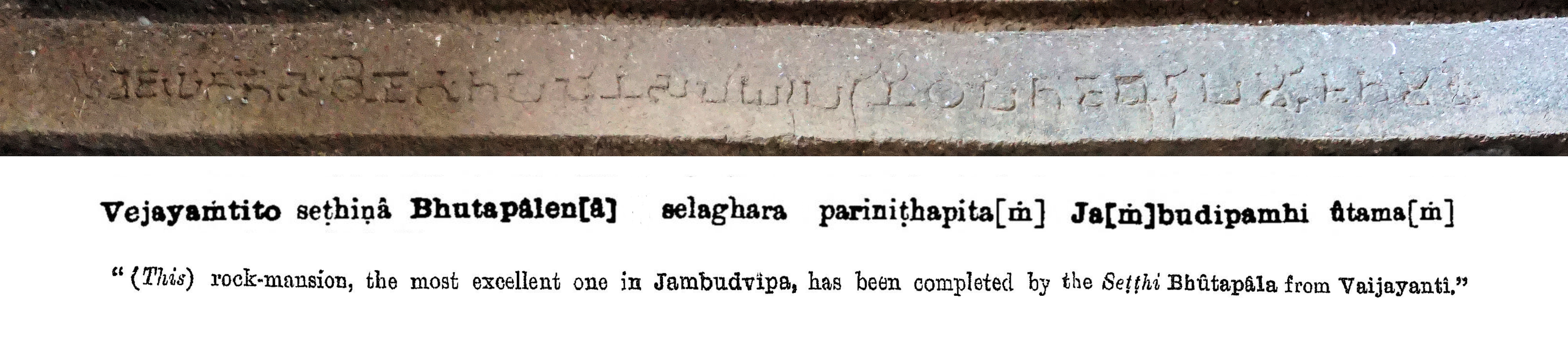
Verandah inscription mentioning the completion by Bhutapala

This Great Chaitya cave, the largest in South Asia, was probably constructed between 50 and 70 CE according to the paleography of the various donatory inscriptions. Numerous donors, mainly local merchants, several of them Yavanas (Greeks), as well as numerous Buddhist monks and nuns, provided donations for the construction of the chaitya cave, as recorded by their dedicatory inscriptions. An inscription among the sculpted decorations at the left end of the veranda mentions the completion of "this stone mansion" by a local merchant or banker (a "setthi") named Bhutapala, from Vaijayanti, but this may only refer to the completion of the ornate sculptures of the veranda.

Upon completion, an inscription mentioning the Western Satraps ruler Nahapana was placed next to the central gate, reporting the dedication of a village to the monks of the Karla chaitya by Nahapana's son-in-law Ushavadata. But neither Nahapana nor Ushavadata are directly mentioned as having created or completed the Karla chaitya itself, although Ushavadata is otherwise known to have built and dedicated a cave with similar design characteristics not far away: Nasik Cave No. 10.

About a generation after Nahapana, the Satavahana ruler Vasishthiputra Pulumavi (130-159 CE) also left a dedicatory inscription on the other side of the central gate.

Numerous decorative panels representing the Buddha with attendants were later added to the veranda during the Mahayana period, and have been dated to the 6th century CE.

==== Comparative chronology ====
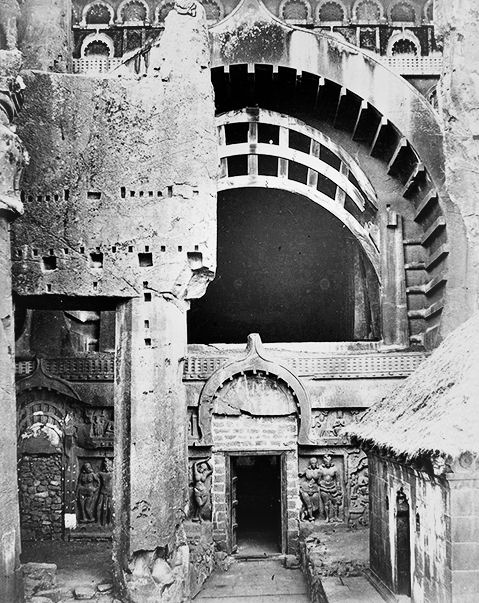
The Great Chaitya, partially obscured from view, in the 19th century.

The Great Chaitya cave of Karla follows, but improves upon, several other Chaitya caves which had been built in Western India under royal sponsorship. It is thought that the chronology of these early Chaitya Caves is as follows: first Cave 9 at Kondivite Caves, then Cave 12 at the Bhaja Caves and Cave 10 of Ajanta Caves, around the 1st century BCE. Then, in chronological order: Cave 3 at Pitalkhora, Cave 1 at Kondana Caves, Cave 9 at Ajanta, which, with its more ornate designs, may have been built about a century later, Cave 18 at Nasik Caves, and Cave 7 at Bedse Caves, to finally culminate with the "final perfection" of the Great Chaitya at Karla Caves.

==== Characteristics ====
The chaitya follows the usual pattern for the period, but is unusually large. It is exceptional for preserving original elements in wood: the prominent lateral ribs and other roof timbers, and the umbrella over the stupa. The chaitya hall only survives in rock-cut examples, but these replicate in stone the form of examples in wood and thatch. In most rock-cut chaityas, the roof timbers are replicated in stone, to considerable visual effect, but in others actual timber was used, for purely aesthetic rather than structural reasons. In most of these cases the timber has long decayed away, as for example in the chaitya at Cave 3, Kanheri Caves. Here, although some were replaced under Lord Curzon in the 19th century, most are original.

R. C. Majumdar quoting James Fergusson explains:

"It resembles an early Christian church in its arrangement; consisting of a nave and side-aisles terminating in an apse or semi-dome, round which the aisle is carried... Fifteen pillars on each side separate the nave from the aisle; each pillar has a tall base, an octagonal shaft, and richly ornamented capital, on the inner front of which kneel two elephants, each bearing two figures, generally a man and a woman, but sometimes two females, all very much better executed than such ornaments usually are; behind are horses and tigers, each bearing a single figure."

Great Chaitya Cave at Karla
General views
Great Chaitya Cave at the extreme right	It is certainly the largest as well as the most complete chaitya cave known in India, and was excavated at a time when the style was in its greatest purity. In it all the architectural defects of the previous examples are removed: the pillars of the nave are quite perpendicular. The screen is ornamented with sculpture -its first appearance apparently in such a position- and the style had reached a perfection that was never afterwards surpassed. The general dimensions of the interior are 124 ft. 3 in. from the entrance to the back wall, by 45 ft. 6 in. in width. The side-aisles, however, are quite narrow, the central one being 25 ft. 7 in., so that the others are only 10 ft. wide, including the thickness of the pillars. In height, however, Karla is only 45 ft. from the floor to the apex. In advance of the Chaitya stands the lion-pillar, in this instance a plain shaft with sixteen flutes, or rather faces, surmounted by a capital not unlike that at Kesariya, but at Karle supporting four lions instead of one. They seem almost certainly to have supported a chakra or Buddhist wheel. A similar pillar probably stood on the opposite side, but it had either fallen or been removed to make way for the little Hindu temple that now occupies its place. Entrance of the Great Chaitya Cave at Karli Pillar at entry of Main Chaitya Karla Chaitya section in perspective.
Veranda
Left veranda panel and portion of the entrance	The outer porch, or veranda, is considerably wider than the body of the building, being 52 ft. wide by 15 ft. deep, and is closed in front by a screen composed of two stout octagonal pillars, without either base or capital, supporting what is now a plain mass of rock, but which was once ornamented by a wooden gallery forming the principal ornament of the facade. Above this a dwarf colonnade or attic of four columns between pilasters admitted light to the great window, and this again was surmounted by a wooden cornice or ornament of some sort. Left veranda panel, with the inscription of Bhutapala above the elephants Left panel elephants and riding Buddhas, with the inscription of Bhutapala on top Right veranda panel Right panel elephant
Entrance
Panorama of the entrance	The entrance, consists of three doorways under a gallery, one leading to the center, and one to each of the side-aisles; and over the gallery the whole end of the hall is open, as in all chaitya halls, forming one great window, through which all the light is admitted. This great window is formed in the shape of a horseshoe, and exactly resembles those used as ornaments on the facade of this cave, as well as on those of Bhaja, Bedsa, and at Nasik, and which are met with everywhere at this age. Within the arch is a framework or centering of wood standing free. It is, like the ribs of the interior, coeval with the building. The sculpture on the screen wall between the doors is mostly of much later date than the cave itself. All the figures of Buddha there represented are of late date and belong to the Mahayana school: these decorative panels next to the main entrance have been dated to the 6th century CE. The larger pairs of figures with Mithuna couples, however, are earlier and may be original. The later inscriptions are of the time of the Satavahana king Pulumavi. Extreme left panel with Mithuna couple Entrance, left panel with Mithuna couples, and central Mahayana-period panel. Entrance, right panel with Mithuna couples, and central Mahayana-period panel. Extreme right panel with Mithuna couple
Hall
Hall of the Great Chaitya Cave at Karla (120 CE) The interior is solemn and grand. An undivided volume of light coming through a single opening overhead at a very favorable angle, and falling directly on the dagoba or principal object in the building, leaving the rest in comparative obscurity. The effect is considerably heightened by the closely set thick columns that divide the aisles from the nave, as they suffice to prevent the boundary walls from ever being seen, and, as there are no openings in the walls, the view between the pillars is practically unlimited.	Immediately under the semidome of the apse, and nearly where the altar stands in Christian churches, is placed the Dagoba, in this instance a plain dome, on a two-storeyed circular drum, the upper margins of each section being carved with rail ornaments. Just under the lower of these are holes or mortices for woodwork, which may have been adorned with hangings, which some of the sculptured representations would lead us to suppose was the usual mode of ornamenting these altars. It is surmounted by a capital or Tee, and on this still stand the remains of an umbrella in wood, somewhat decayed and distorted by age. This canopy was circular and minutely carved on the under surface. Left row of columns Hall of the Great Chaitya Right row of columns Fifteen pillars on each side separate the nave from the aisles; each pillar has a tall base, an octagonal shaft, and richly ornamented capital, on the inner front of which kneel two elephants, each bearing two figures, generally a man and a woman, but sometimes two females, all very much better executed than such ornaments usually are; behind are horses and tigers, each bearing a single figure. The seven pillars behind the altar are plain octagonal piers, without either base or capital, and the four under the entrance gallery differ considerably from those at the sides. The sculptures on the capitals supply the place usually occupied by frieze and cornice in Greek architecture; and in other examples plain painted surfaces occupy the same space. Above this springs the roof, semicircular in general section, but somewhat stilted at the sides, so as to make its height greater than the semi-diameter. It is ornamented even at this day by a series of wooden ribs, probably coeval with the excavation, which prove that the roof is not a copy of a masonry arch, but of some sort of timber construction. Roof Pillars of the Great Chaitya Inscription on pillar (5th pillar, right row, donation by a Yavana ("Indo-Greek") named Chitasa gatana ). Pillar carvings (8th pillar, right row). Inscription: "(This) pillar (is) the pious gift of the lay worshiper Dhamula of Gonekaka". Row of capitals. Structure of a capital. Complete capital. Capital detail. Capital detail Stupa

==== Main inscriptions ====
Bhutapala

Bhutapala inscription
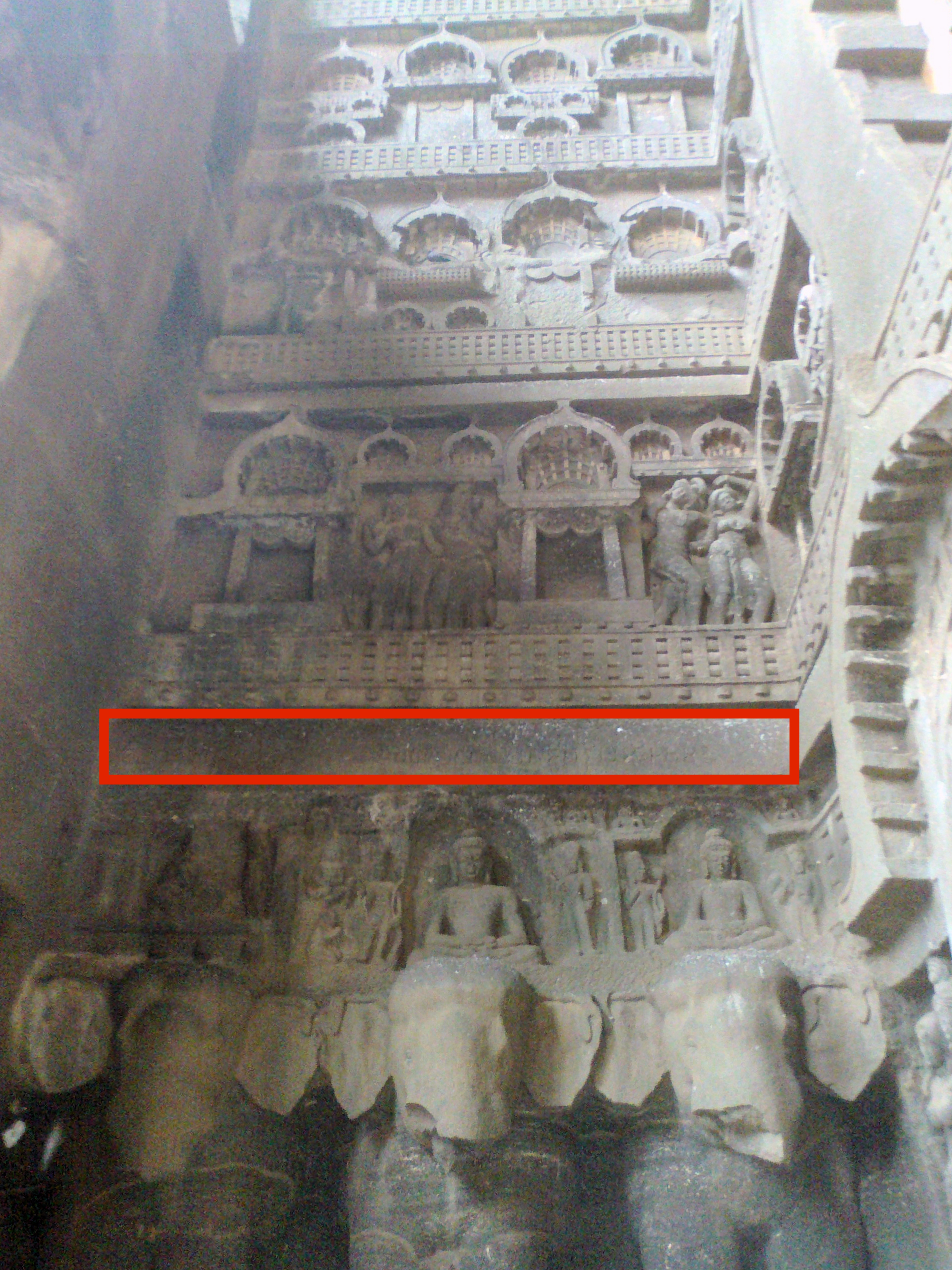
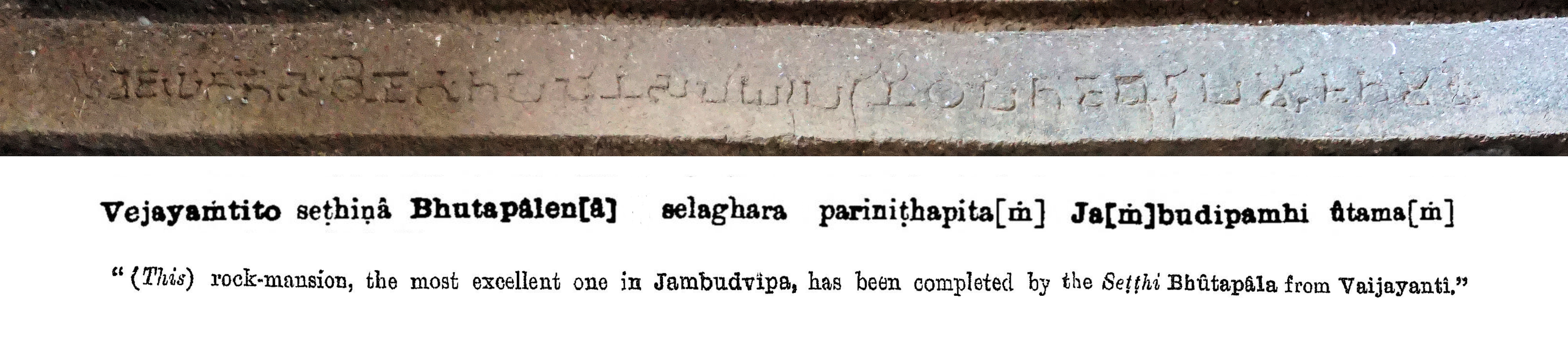
Great Chaitya inscription of Buthapala, on the left wall of the veranda, between the row of elephants and the multi-storied mansion.

An inscription on the left wall of the veranda, over the line of facing elephants and under the scultpture of a multi-storied building, mentions the completion of the "rock mansion" by a setthi (merchant) from Vaijayanti (Banavasi) named Bhutapala:

(This) rock-mansion, the most excellent in Jambudvipa, has been completed by the Setthi Bhutapala from Vaijayanti.

— Inscription 1 of Buthapala, Karla Caves.

The "completion" of the "rock-mansion" mentioned by Bhutapala may only refer to the ornate sculptures of the veranda, specifically to the multi-storied mansion sculpted on top of the inscription, rather than the cave as a whole, since the various components of the Karla caves generally bear inscriptions by their individual donators.

Yavana (Greek) donors

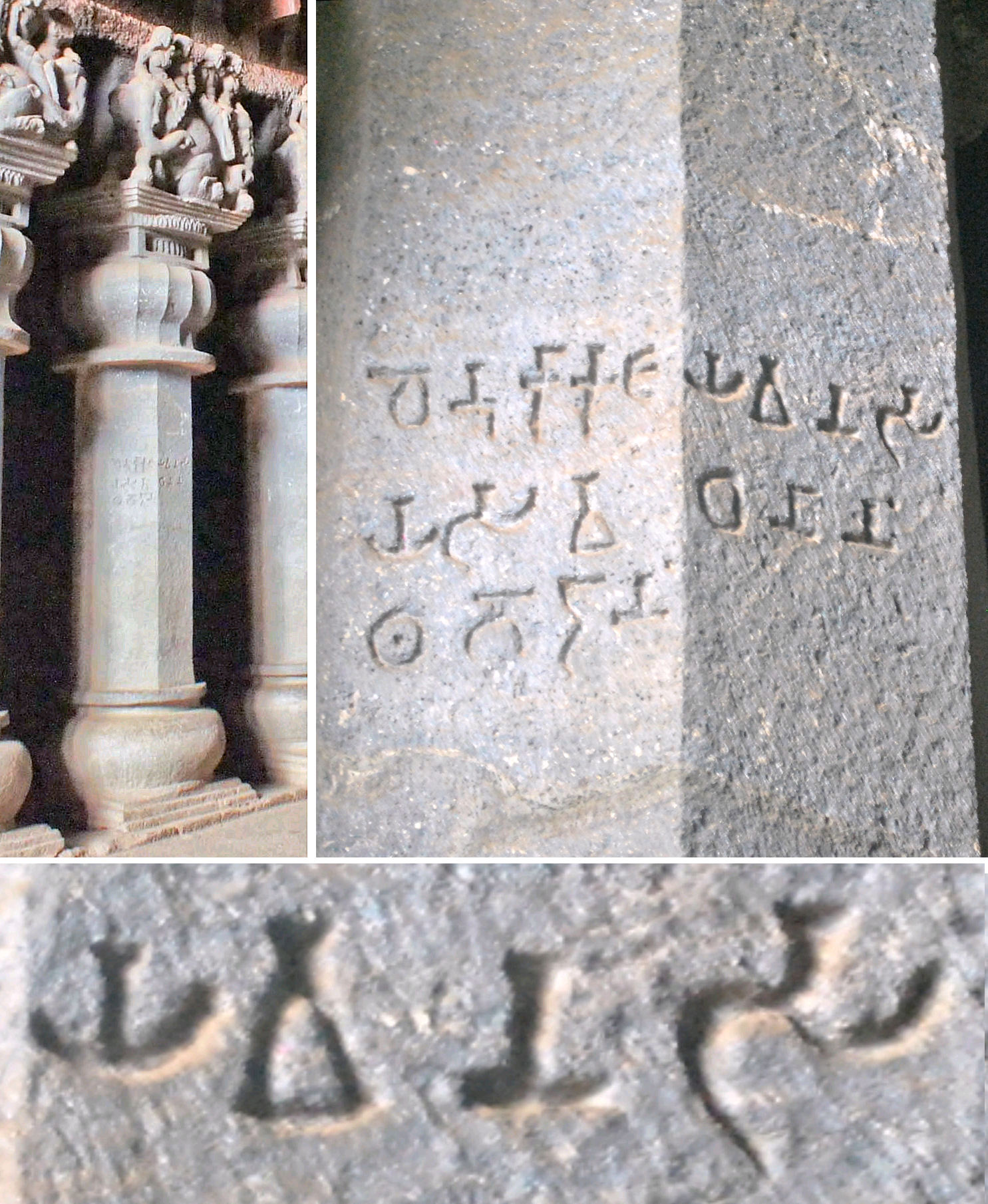
Left pillar No.9 of the Great Chatya. This pillar was donated by a Yavana circa 120 CE, like five other pillars. The inscription of this pillar reads: "Dhenukakata Yavanasa/ Yasavadhanana[m]/ thabo dana[m]" i.e. "(This) pillar (is) the gift of the Yavana Yasavadhana from Denukakata". Below: detail of the word "Ya-va-na-sa" in old Brahmi script:.

There are also inscriptions by private donors, who contributed parts of the Great Chaitya, including self-described Yavana (Asiatic Greek or Indo-Greek) donors, who donated six of the pillars, although their names are Buddhist names. They account for nearly half of the known dedicatory inscriptions on the pillars of the Chaitya.

- 3rd pillar of the left row:

"(This) pillar (is) the gift of the Yavana Sihadhaya from Dhenukataka"

- 4th pillar of the left row:

"Of Dhamma, a Yavana from Dhenukakata"

- 9th pillar of the left row:

"(This) pillar (is) the gift of the Yavana Yasavadhana from Denukakata"

- 5th pillar of the right row:

"This pillar is the gift of the Yavana Vitasamghata from Umehanakata"

- 13th pillar of the right row:

"(This) pillar (is) the gift of the Yavana Dhamadhaya from Denukakata"

- 15th pillar of the right row:

"(This) pillar (is) the gift of the Yavana Chulayakha from Dhenukakata". Next to the inscription is a Buddhist Swastika.

The city of Dhenukakata is thought to be Danahu near the city of Karli. It is said by another donor in another inscription that it has a "vaniya-gama" (A community of merchants).

The Yavanas are also known for their donation of a complete cave at the Nasik Caves (cave No.17), and for their donations with inscriptions at the Junnar caves.

Nahapana

An important dedicatory inscription relates to Nahapana on the lintel to the right of the entrance of the Great Chaitya (Valurak is thought to be an ancient name for Karla Caves):

Nahapana inscription
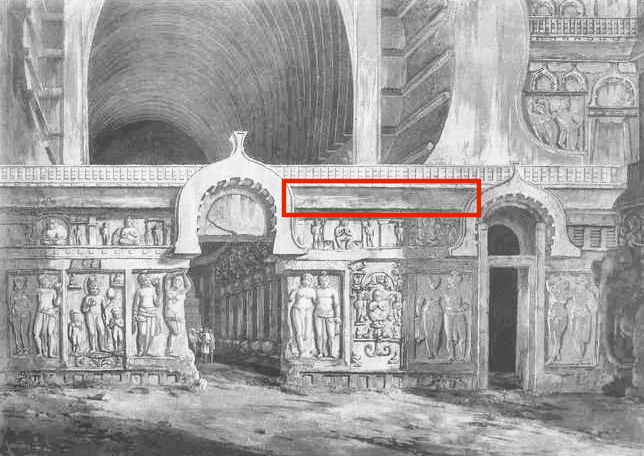
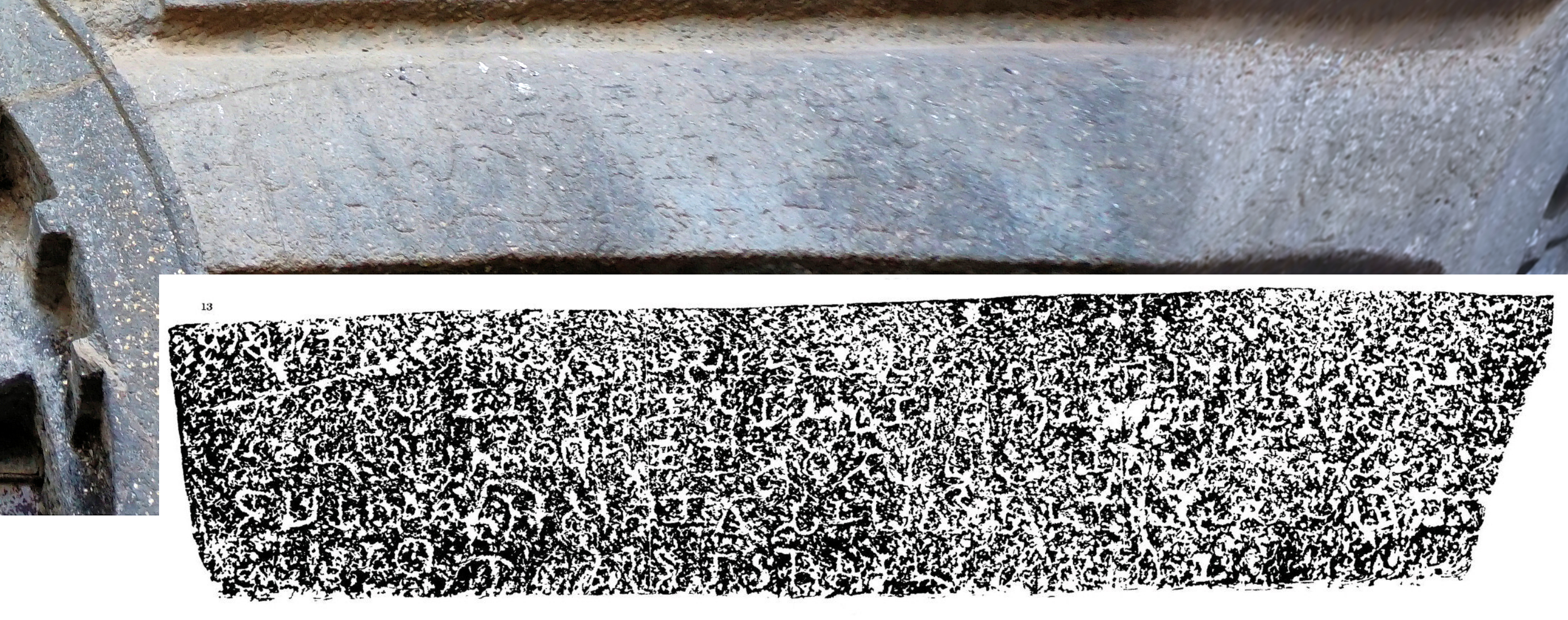
Great Chaitya inscription 13 of Nahapana, at the right of the main entrance.

Success!! By Usabhadata, the son of Dinaka and the son-in-law of the king, the Khaharata, the Kshatrapa Nahapana, who gave three hundred thousand cows, who made gifts of gold and a tirtha on the river Banasa, who gave to the Devas and Bramhanas sixteen villages, who at the pure tirtha Prabhasa gave eight wives to the Brahmanas, and who also fed annually a hundred thousand Brahmanas- there has been given the village of Karajika for the support of the ascetics living in the caves at Valuraka without any distinction of sect or origin, for all who would keep the varsha.

— Inscription 13 of Nahapana, Karla Caves, 120 CE.

Sri Pulumayi

Vasishthiputra Pulumavi inscription
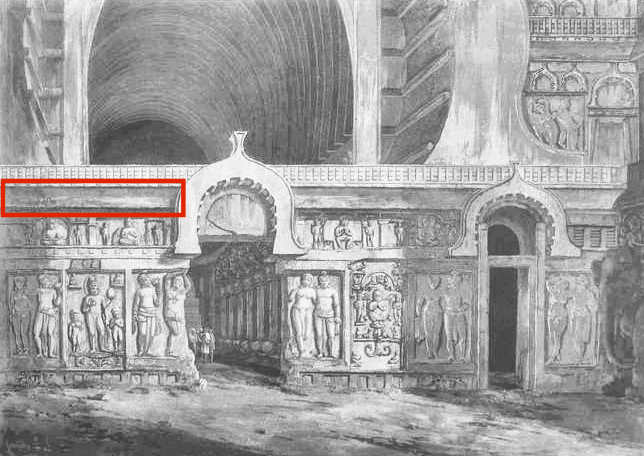
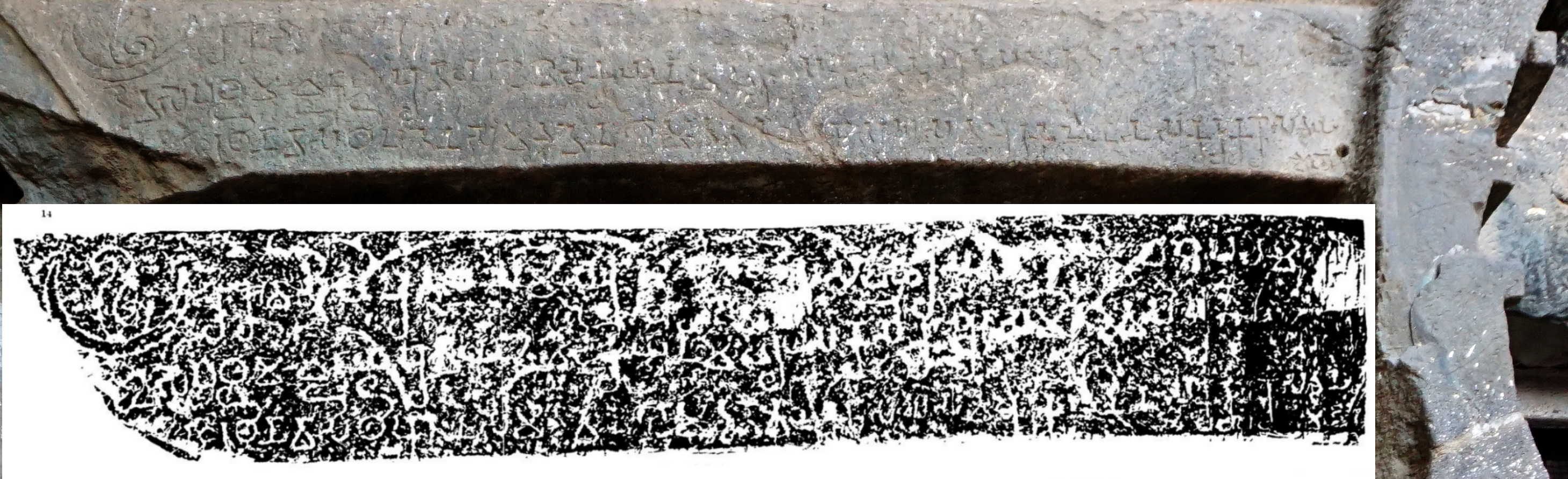
Karla inscription of Vasishthiputra Pulumavi, left of the main entrance

On the lintel to the left of the main entrance to the Great Chaitya, facing the inscription of Nahapana and posterior to it by a generation, there is also an inscription by Satavahana ruler Sri Pulumayi, that is, Vasishthiputra Pulumavi (130-159 CE):

In the seventh year of the king Sri Pulamavi, son of Vasithi, in the fifth fortnight of summer, on the first day, on the above, by the Maharathi Somadeva son of Vasithi, the son of the Maharathi Mitradeva son of Kosiki, of the Okhalakiyas, there was given to the community of Valuraka, of the Valuraka caves, a village with its taxes ordinary and extraordinary, with its income fixed or proportional.

— Inscription 14 of Sri Pulumavi.

==== Architectural parallels ====
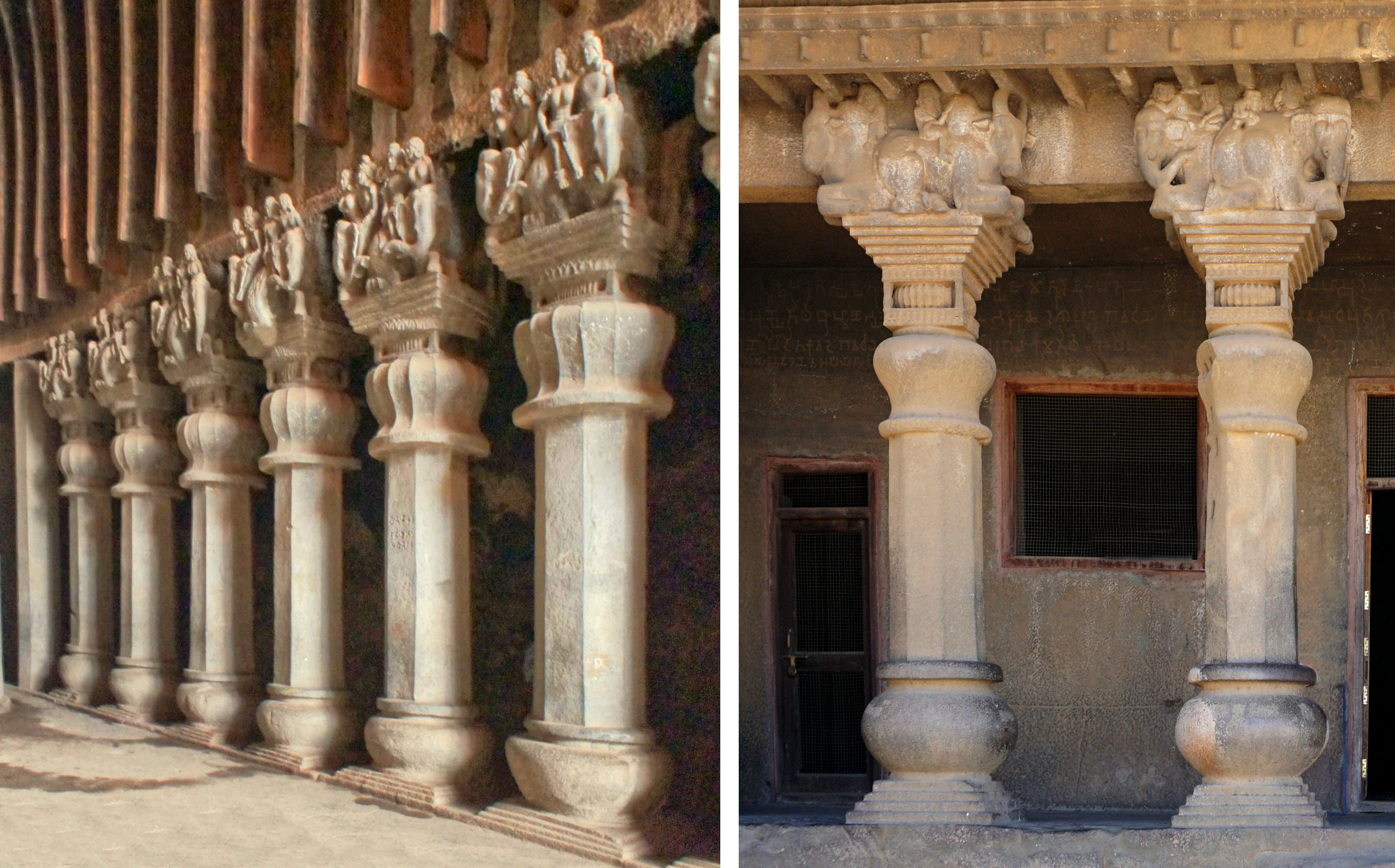
Karla Caves Chaitya pillars (left) compared to Nasik Caves Vihara No10 pillars (right), built by Ushavadata, son-in-law of Nahapana, circa 120 CE.

The pillars of the Chaitya at Karla are most similar to the pillars of Vihara No.10, at Nasik Caves, also built by Ushavadata, the son-in-law of Nahapana ("Ushavadata, son of Dinika, son-in- law of king Nahapana, the Kshaharata Kshatrapa, (...) has caused this cave to be made and these cisterns."). The proportions and general layout are similar, as are the various architectural elements, including the shape of the bells, the framed toruses, the bases, the capitals and they supporting animals and human figures. These points to a contemporaneity of the Karla Chaitya and the Nahapana vihara at Nasik, circa 70-120 CE.

On the contrary, the pillars of Nasik vihara No.3 built by the mother of Gautamiputra Satakarni circa 150 CE, depart from the elegant shapes and simplicity of the pillars at Karla and Vihara No.10. They are more similar to those of the Chaitya at Kanheri, built by Yajna Sri Satakarni circa 170 CE.

=== Other Chaityas and Viharas ===
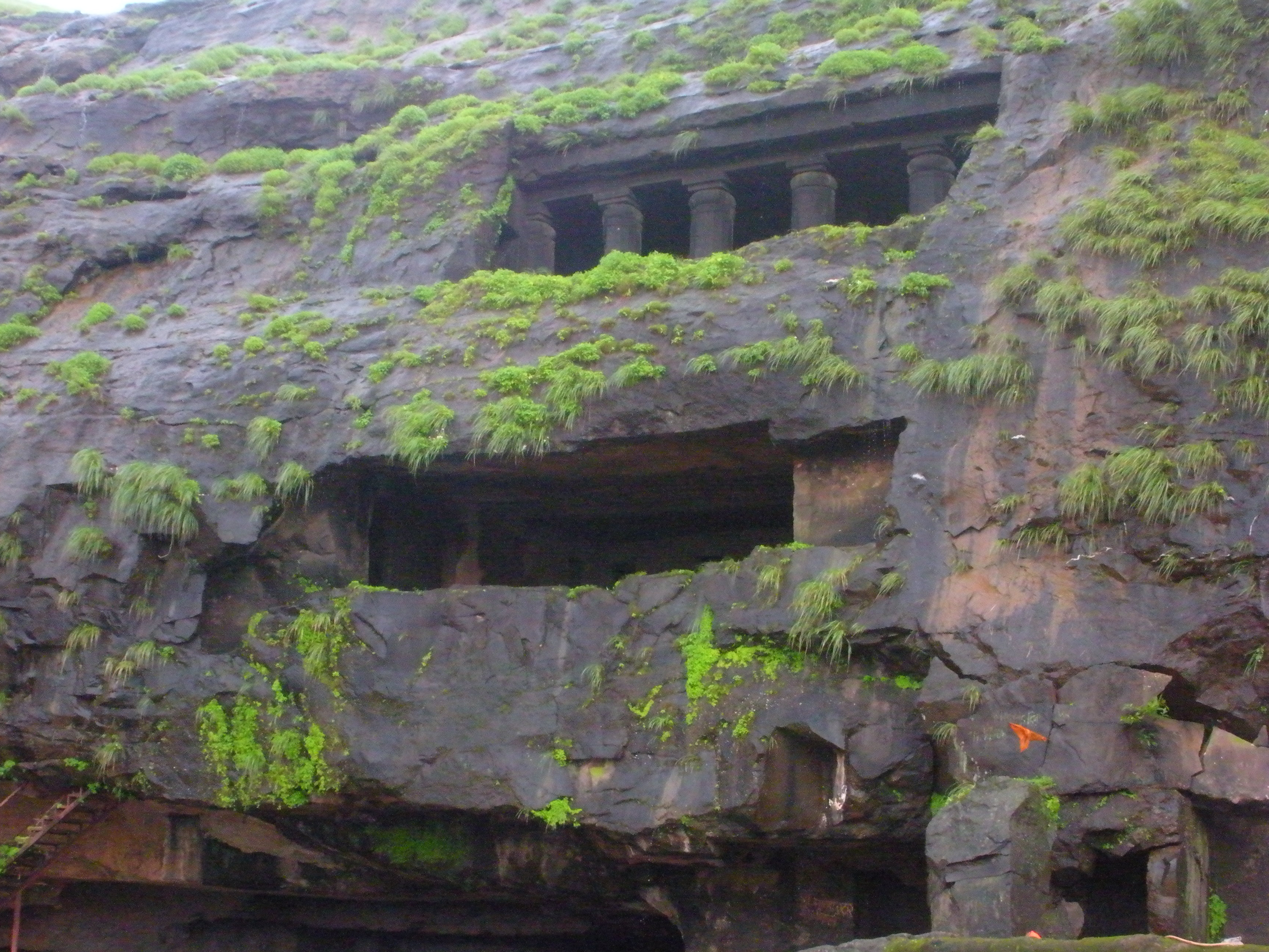
View of the hermitages.

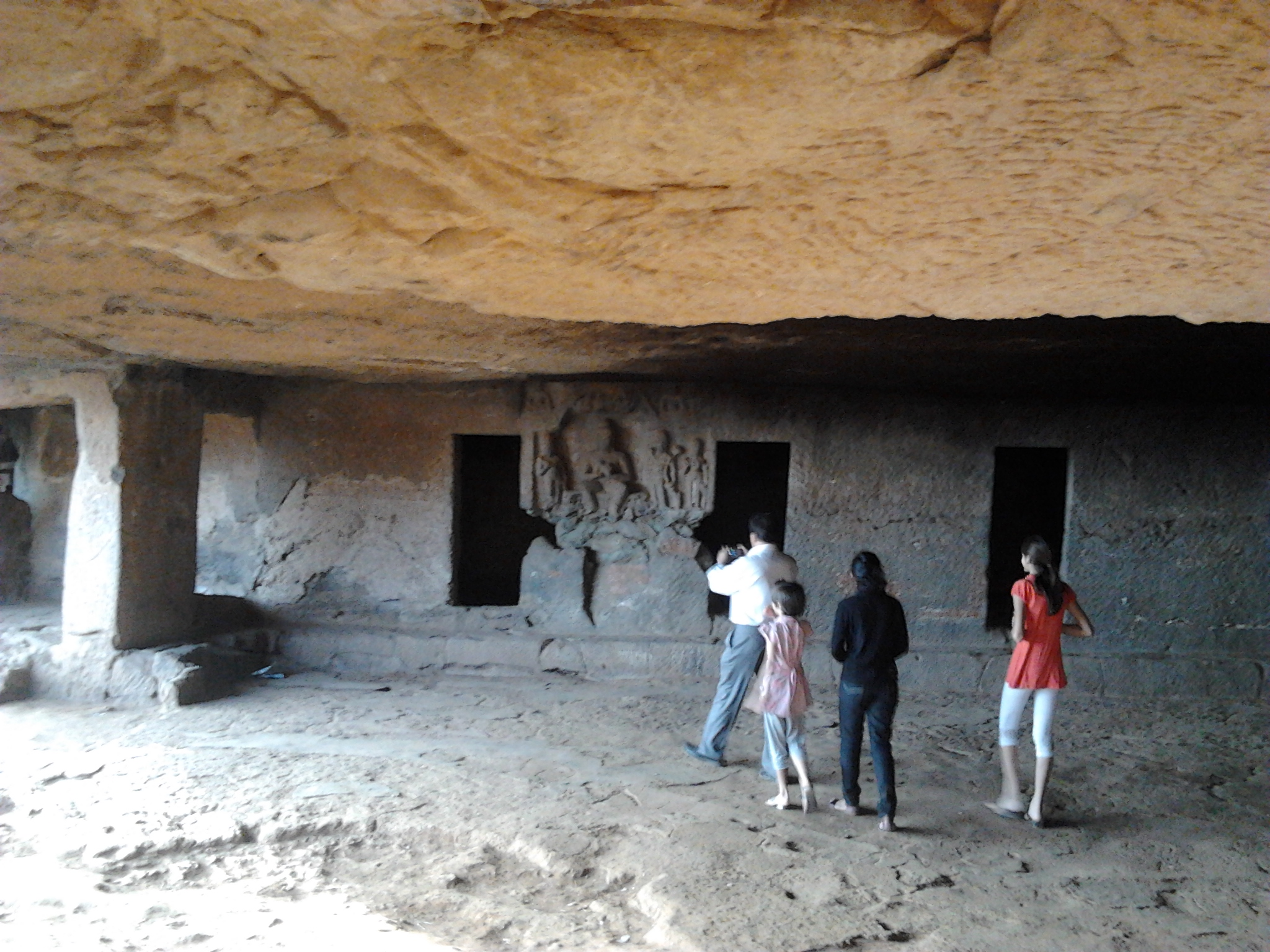
Another portion of the caves.

Within the complex are a great many other carved chaityas, as well as viharas, or dwelling places for the caves' monks. A notable feature of these caves is their arched entrances and vaulted interiors. Names of donors are inscribed on pillars in Brahmi script in these caves. The outside facade has intricate details carved into it in an imitation of finished wood. The central motif is a large horseshoe arch. There is an Ashokan pillar at the front, with a closed stone facade and torana in between.

One of the Vihara cells bears an inscription of the Satavahana ruler Vasishthiputra Pulumavi (130-159 CE).

Success!! On the second day of the third fortnight of winter in the twenty fourth year of King Sri Pulumavi, son of Vasithi, this pious gift of the lay worshiper Harapharana, son of Setapharana, a Sovasaka, living in Abulama, a nine-celled hall, has been given to the universal Sangha, as special property of the Mahasamghikas, in honor of his parents and securing the welfare and happiness of all beings. In the twenty first year it had been completed and ...... to me by Budharakhita and his mother ...., a lay worshipper. The ......a pious gift of Budharakhita's mother.

— Inscription of Vasishthiputra Pulumavi, Karla Caves Vihara.

=== Influences ===
Several Chaitya Caves were built in imitation of the Great Chaitya at Karla. This is especially the case of the Great Chaitya at Kanheri, in the northern suburb in Mumbai, probably built during the reign of Yajna Sri Satakarni (circa 150 CE). According to Fergusson, it is certain that the plan of the Chaitya Cave at Kanheri is a literal copy of that at Karle, but the architectural details show exactly the same difference in style as is found between Cave 17 (period of Nahapana circa 115 CE) and Cave 3 (period of Sri Pulumavi, circa 170 CE) at the Nasik Caves.

Some caves at Ajanta, such as Cave 19, built in the 5th century CE, were also modeled after the Karla Great Chaitya.

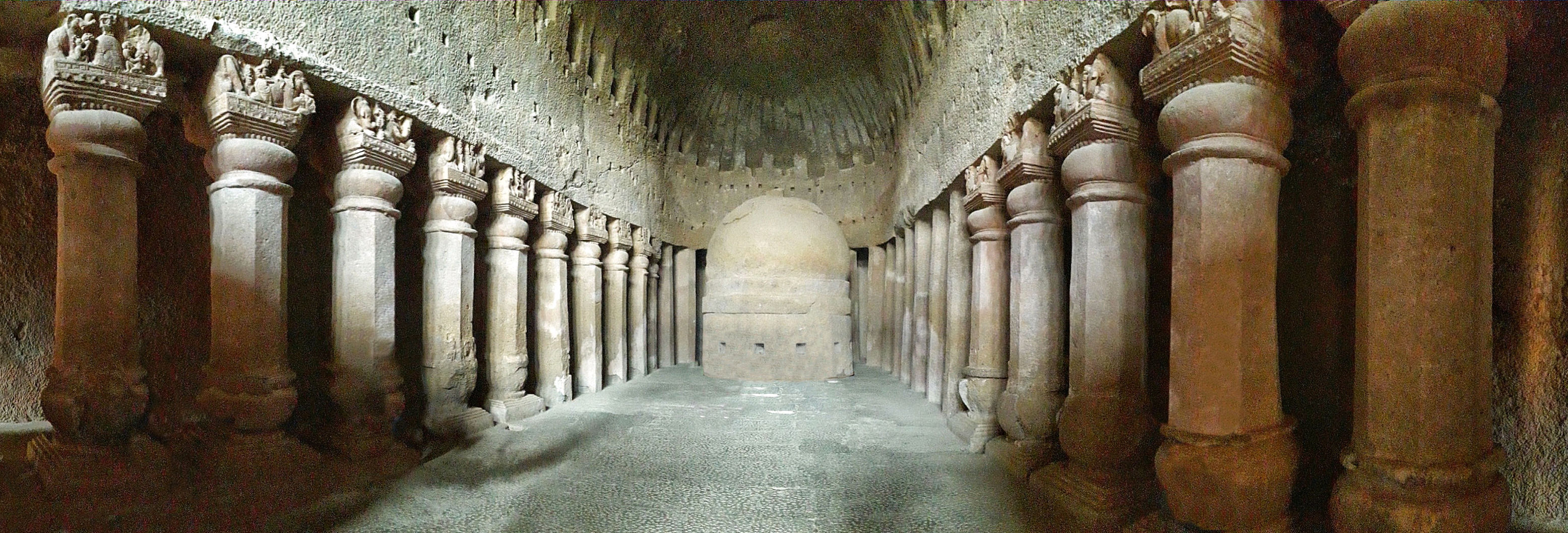
Great Chaitya hall at Kanheri in Mumbai. A slightly late imitation of the Great Chaitya at Karla Caves.

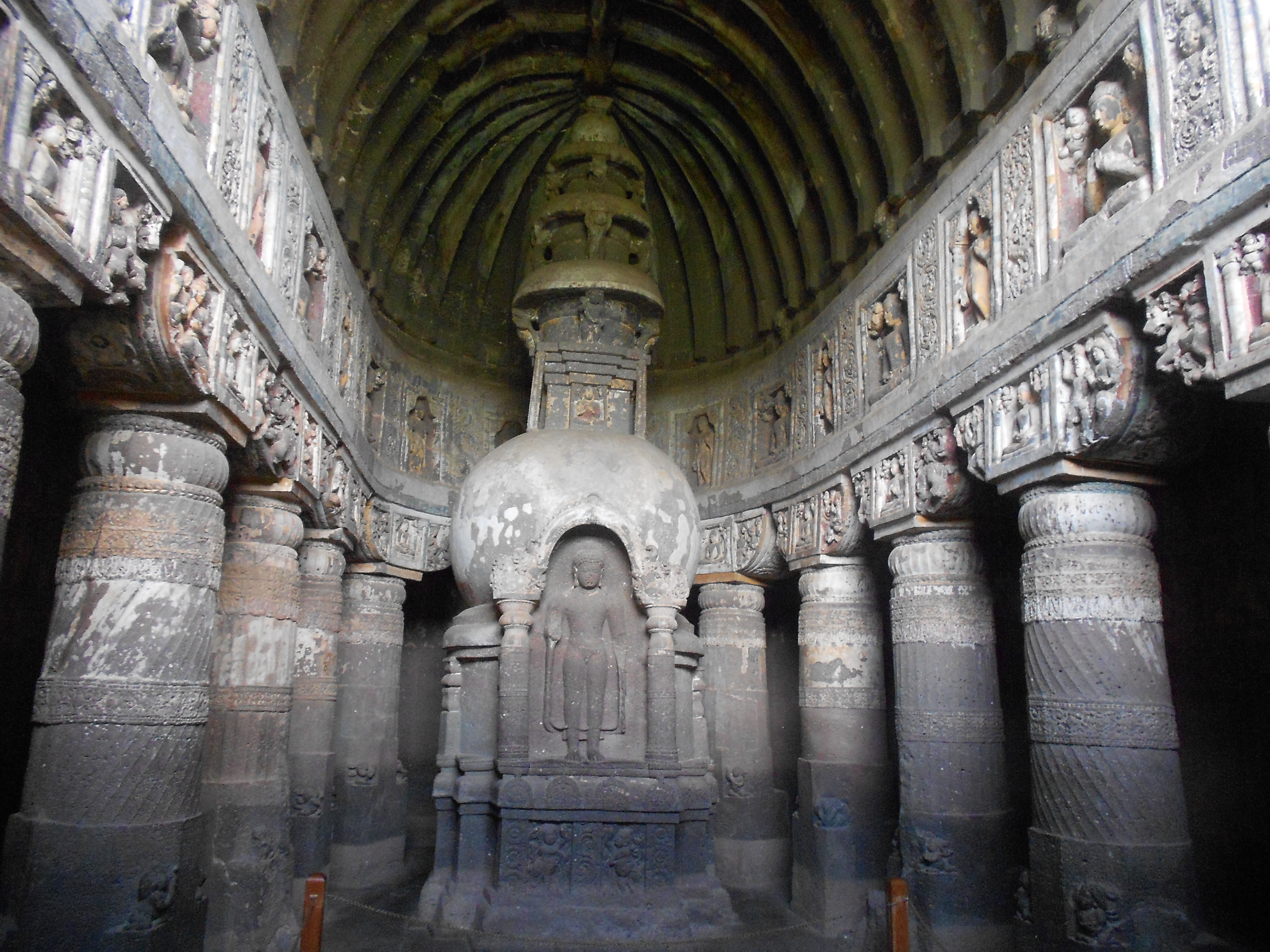
Cave 19 at Ajanta Caves was also modeled after the Karla Great Chaitya, built in the 5th century CE.

Hindu temples, the first instances of which are known from the Gupta period in the 4th-5th century CE, seem to have borrowed influences from early Buddhist Chaitya Caves such as the Karla Chaitya, especially in the apsidial design, as seen in Durga temple in Aihole.

=== Cave painting ===
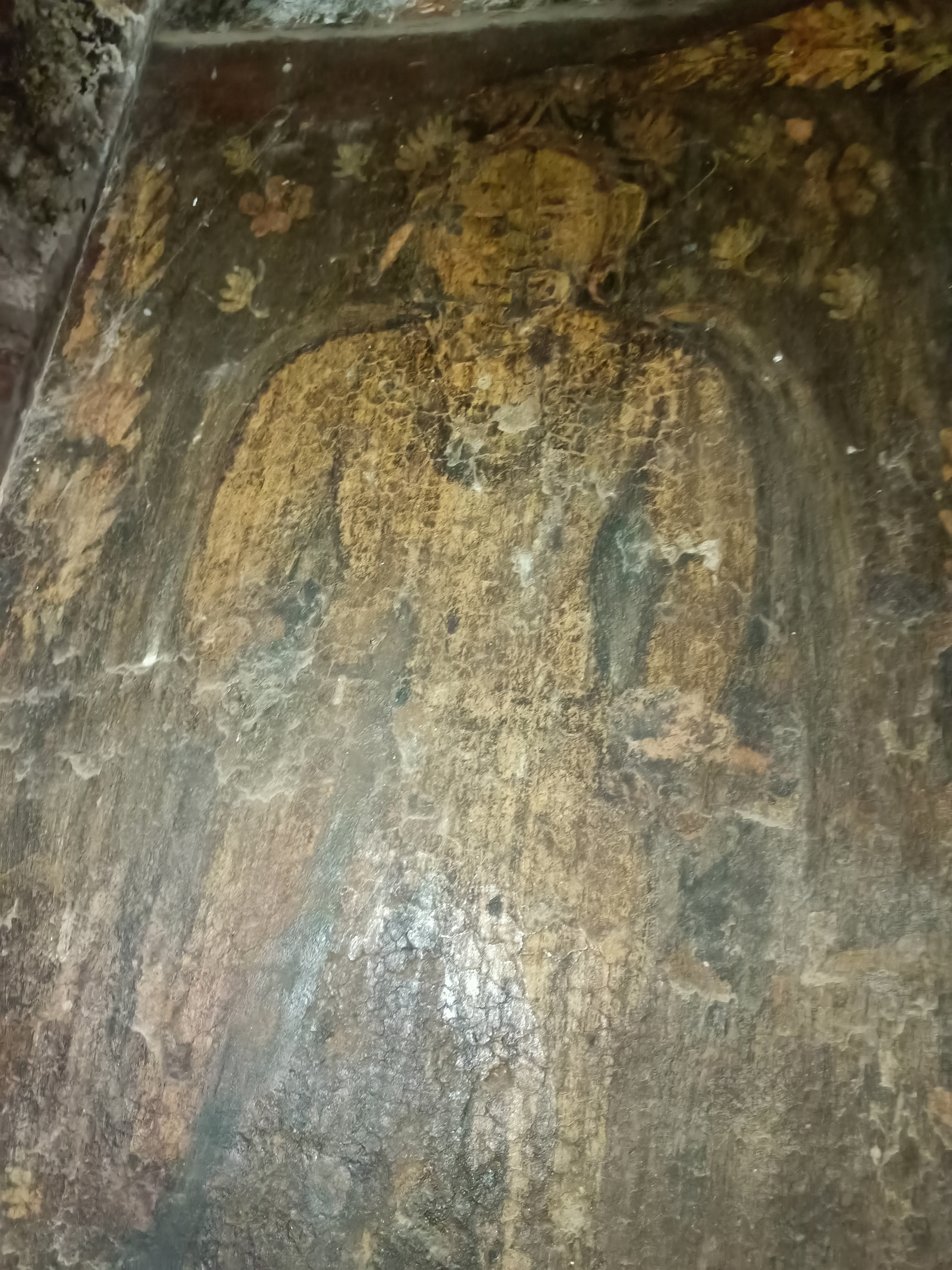
Only cave painting found at Karle Cave

In Great Chaitya cave, there is a painting on the top backside of 10th pillar right side of the entrance. One has to use mobile light to see the painting.

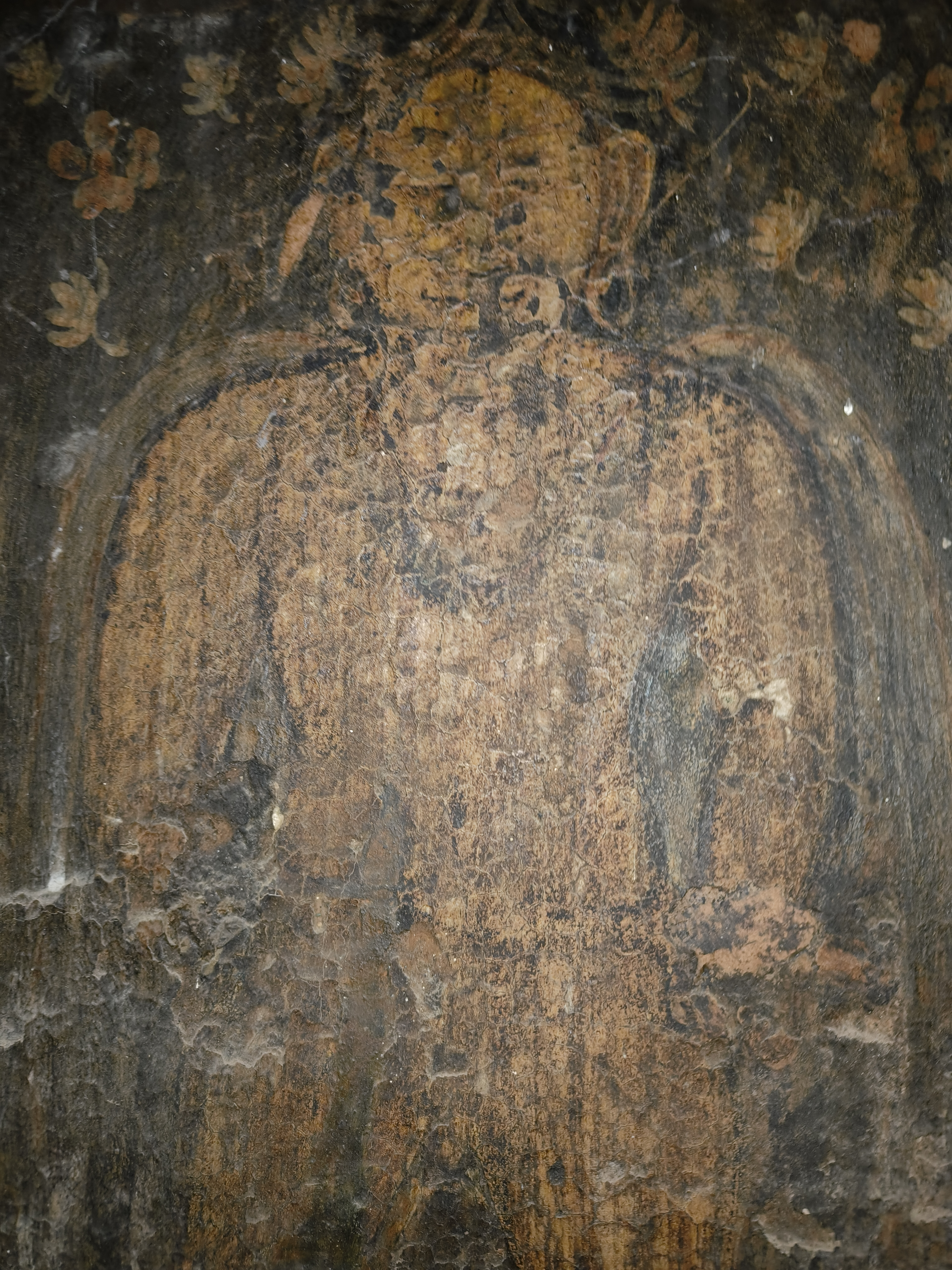

== See also ==
- Bhaja Caves
- Bedse Caves
