= Patan Caves =

Buddhist caves in Maharashtra, India

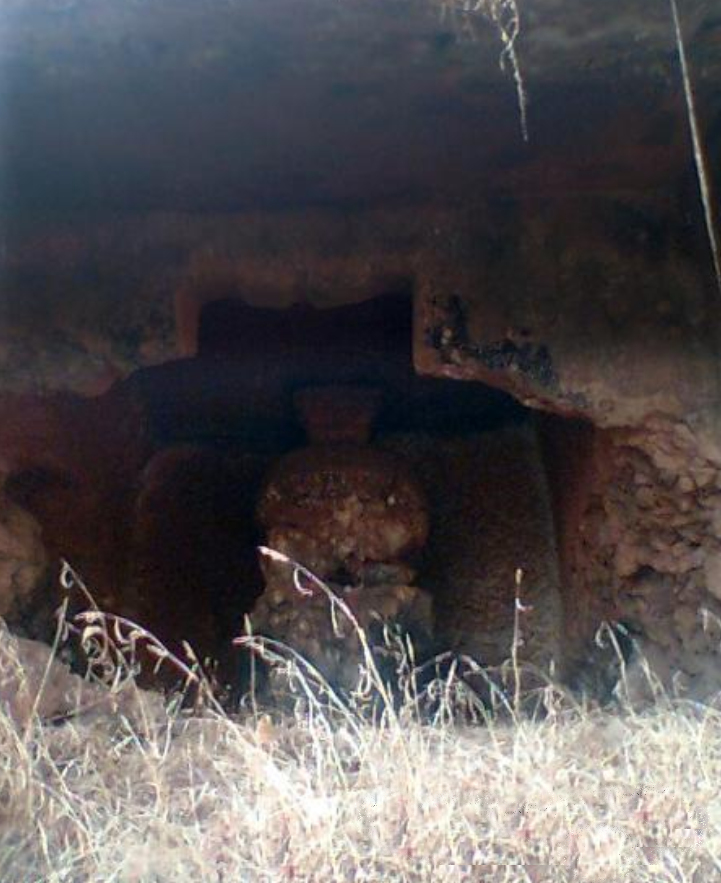
- A cave in Tamkane, Patan 17.415278°N 73.870556°E

- Location within India
- Location: Patan, Maharashtra
- Coordinates: 17.415198°N 73.870929°E

The Patan Buddhist caves are recently discovered rock-cut caves, near Patan, Maharashtra, in the district of Satara. Eleven caves were discovered all together, spread in four different areas of Patan, in Tamkane, Yerphal, Yeradvadi and Digevadi.

The caves are dated to the first half of the 2nd century CE.

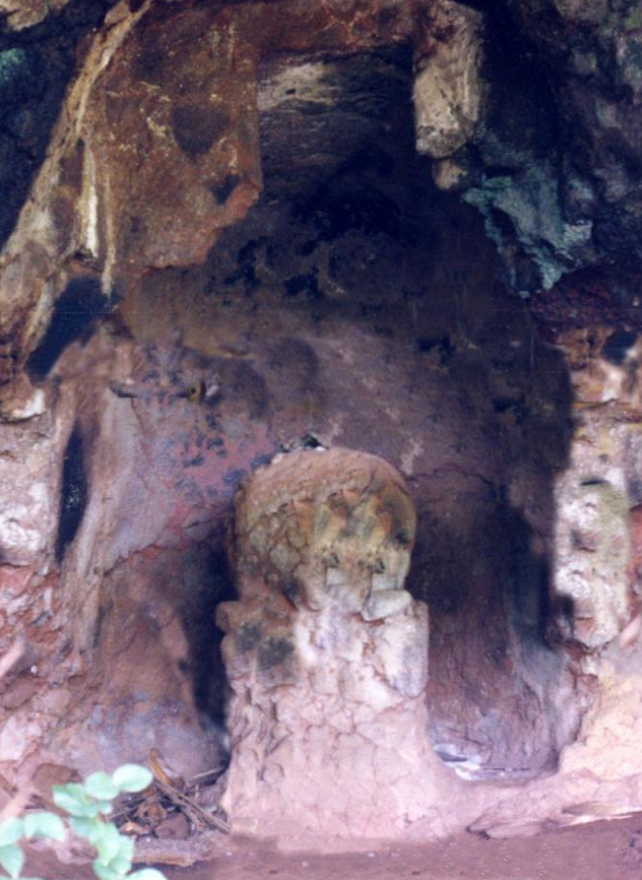
Yerphale Buddhist cave in Patan 17.415198°N 73.870929°E
