= Barabar Caves =

Ancient rock-cut caves in India with Ashokan inscriptions

The Barabar Hill Caves
- Barābar, Satgharva, Satgharwa
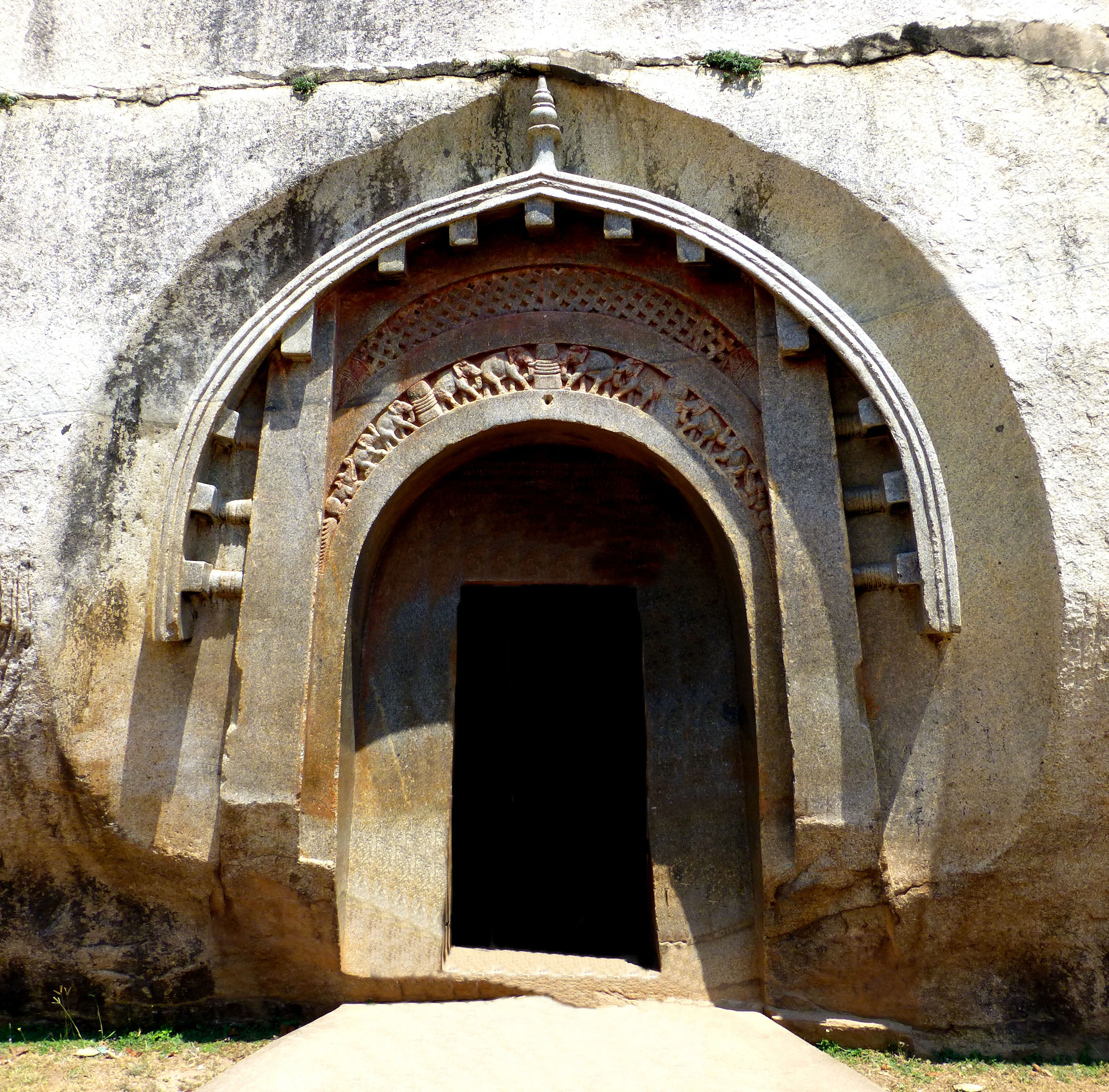
- The carved entrance of Lomas Rishi cave, (c. 250 BC) is the first known Maurya relief

- Location in Bihar, India Barabar Caves (Bihar)
- 25.005°N 85.063°E
- Type: Caves
- Location: Jehanabad district, Bihar, India
- Part of: Barabar and Nagarjuni hills

History
- Built: 322–185 BCE

The Barabar Hill Caves are the oldest surviving rock-cut caves in India, dating from the Maurya Empire (322–185 BCE), some with Ashokan inscriptions, located in the Makhdumpur region of Jehanabad district, Bihar, India, 24 km (15 mi) north of Gaya.

These caves are situated in the twin hills of Barabar (four caves) and Nagarjuni (three caves); caves of the 1.6 km (0.99 mi)-distant Nagarjuni Hill are sometimes singled out as the Nagarjuni Caves. These rock-cut chambers bear dedicatory inscriptions in the name of "King Piyadasi" for the Barabar group, and "Devanampiya Dasaratha" for the Nagarjuni group, thought to date back to the 3rd century BCE during the Maurya period, and to correspond respectively to Ashoka (reigned 273–232 BCE) and his grandson, Dasharatha Maurya.

The sculptured surround to the entrance to the Lomas Rishi Cave is the earliest survival of the ogee shaped "chaitya arch" or chandrashala that was to be an important feature of Indian rock-cut architecture and sculptural decoration for centuries. The form was a reproduction in stone of buildings in wood and other plant materials.

The caves were used by ascetics from the Ajivika sect, founded by Makkhali Gosala, a contemporary of Gautama Buddha, the founder of Buddhism, and of Mahavira, the last and 24th Tirthankara of Jainism. The Ajivikas had many similarities with Buddhism as well as Jainism. Also present at the site are several rock-cut Buddhist and Hindu sculptures and inscriptions from later periods.

Most caves at Barabar consist of two chambers, carved entirely out of granite, with a highly polished internal surface, the "Mauryan polish" also found on sculptures, and exciting echo effects.

The caves were featured – located in a fictitious Marabar – in the book A Passage to India by English author E. M. Forster.

== Caves at Barabar Hill ==
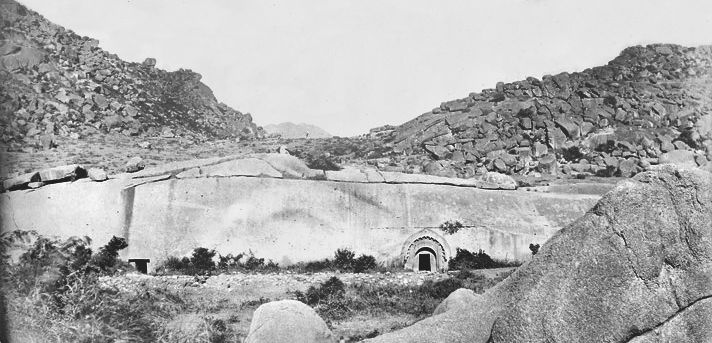
Panorama of Barabar hill, with entrances to Sudama and Lomas Rishi caves

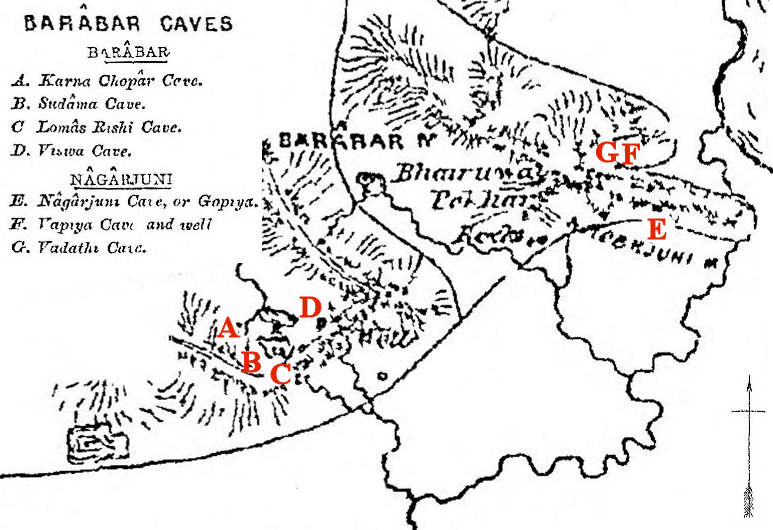
Map of the caves in Barabar and Nagarjuni hills

Barabar Hill contains four caves: Karan Chaupar, Lomas Rishi, Sudama, and Visvakarma. Sudama and Lomas Rishi are the earliest examples of rock-cut architecture in India, with architectural detailing made in the Mauryan period. Similar examples include the Buddhist chaitya found in the Ajanta and Karla Caves of Maharashtra. The Barabar caves greatly influenced the tradition of rock-cut architecture in the Indian subcontinent.

- Lomas Rishi Cave has an arch-like facade that imitates contemporary timber architecture. On the doorway, carved elephants proceed in a row along the curved architrave towards stupa emblems.
- Sudama Cave was dedicated by Mauryan Emperor Ashoka in 261 BCE. The arches of Sudama cave have a bow shape. The cave consists of a circular vaulted chamber with a rectangular mandapa.
- Karan Chaupar (Karna Chaupar) contains a single rectangular room with polished surfaces, and an inscription which could be dated to 245 BCE.
- Visvakarma Cave, reachable by Ashoka steps hewn in the cliff, consists of two rectangular rooms.

=== Lomas Rishi Cave ===
Lomas Rishi Cave
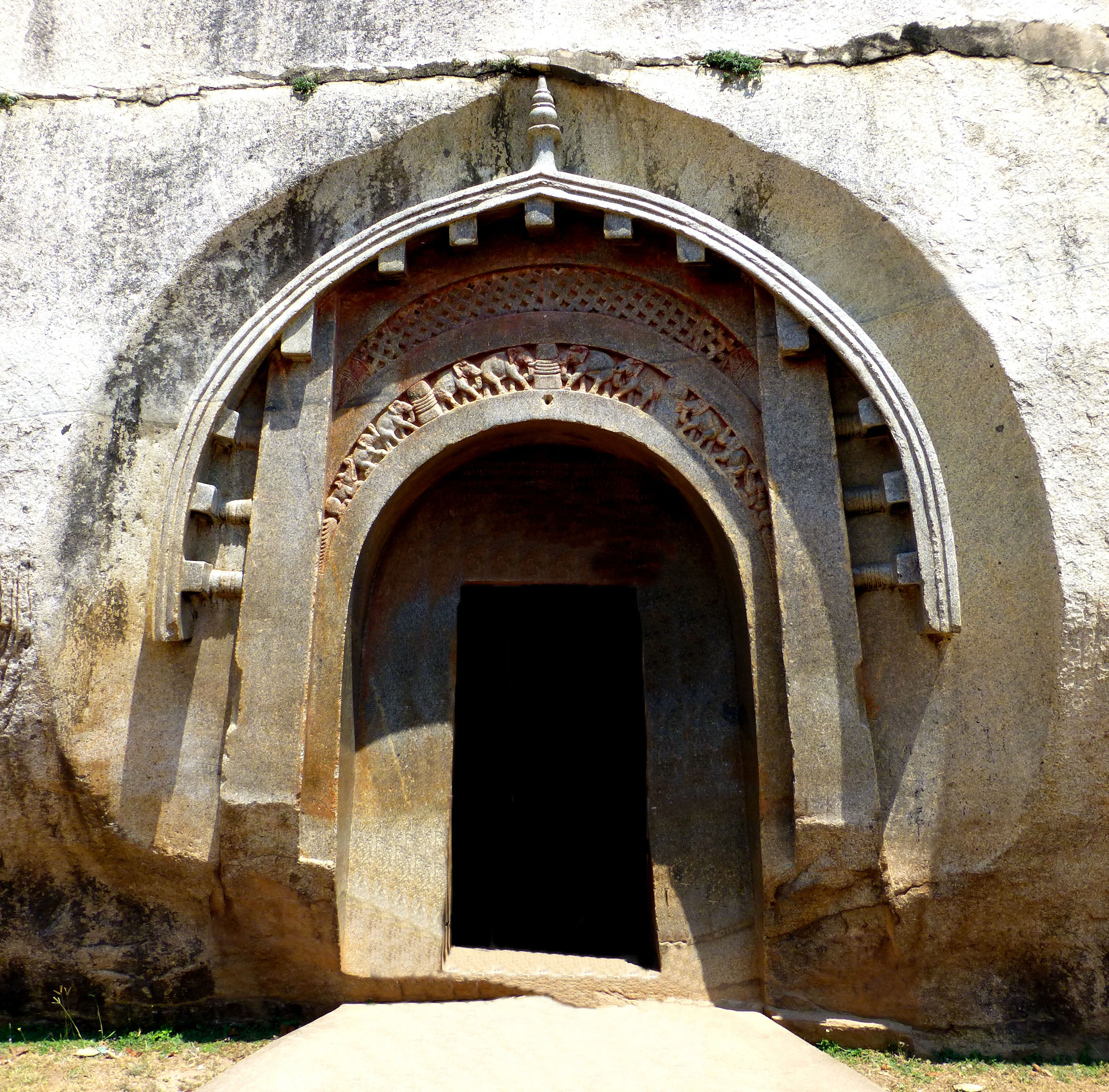
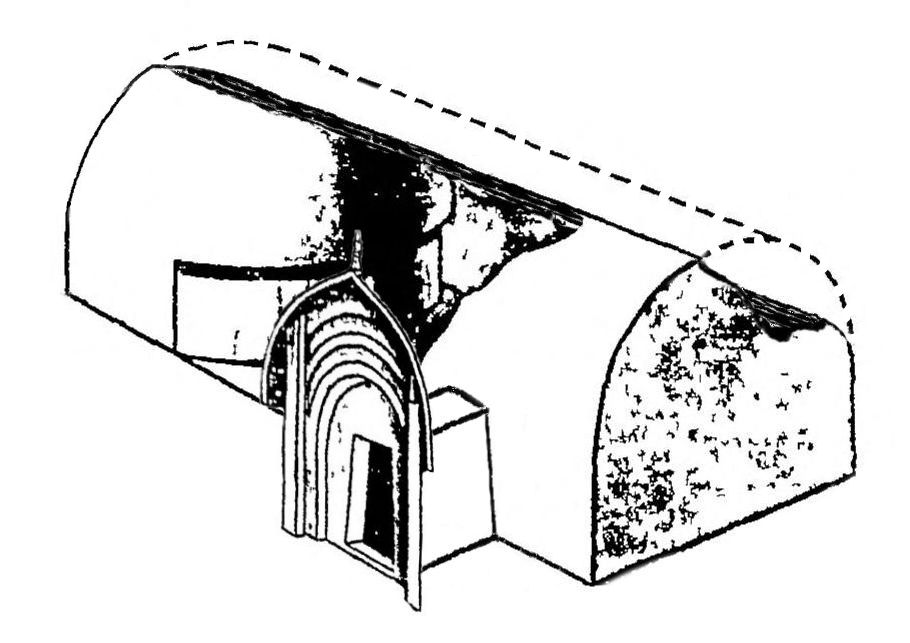
Photograph and volume representation of Lomas Rishi Cave. The digging of the vault has never been finished

The cave of Lomas Rishi has a carved entranceway. It is on the southern side of the Barabar granite hill, adjacent to the Sudama cave which is on the left. Lomas Rishi consists of two rooms: a rectangular space measuring 9.86 x 5.18m, and a circular, semi-hemispherical chamber 5m in diameter, accessed by a narrow rectangular passage.

This cave has an arched facade that probably imitates contemporary wooden architecture. On the periphery of the door, along the curve of the architrave, a line of elephants advance in the direction of stupa emblems. This is the characteristic form of the "chaitya arch" or chandrashala, an important feature of rock architecture and sculpture for many centuries, and long considered a stone reproduction of wooden buildings and other plant materials. According to historian S. P. Gupta, Lomas Rishi's immediate successors are the Kondivite and Guntupalli caves.

Lomas Rishi has no Ashoka inscription, perhaps because it has never been completed due to structural rock slide problems.

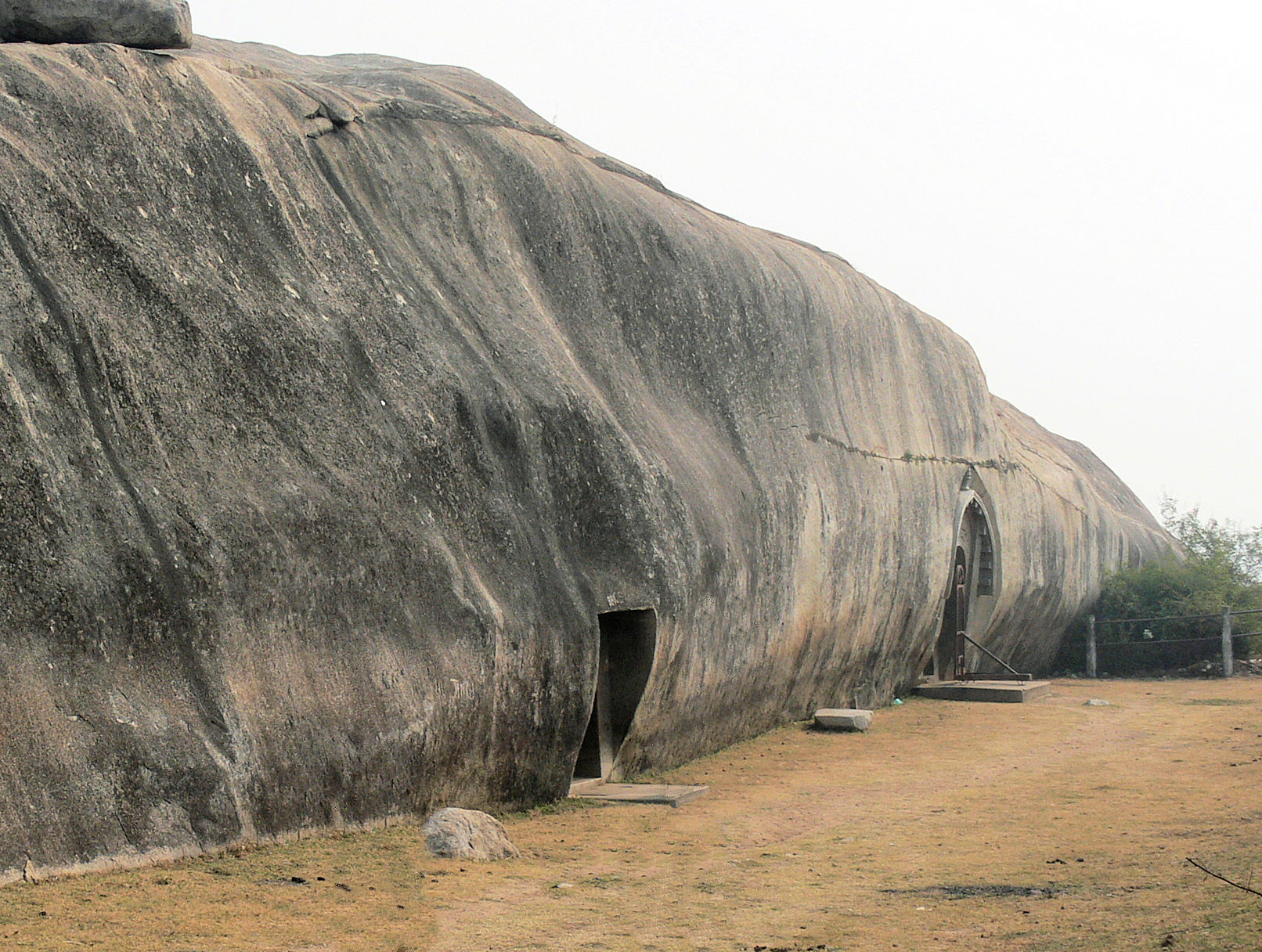
Entrances of Sudama Cave, and further, Lomas Rishi Cave, Barabar Hill.

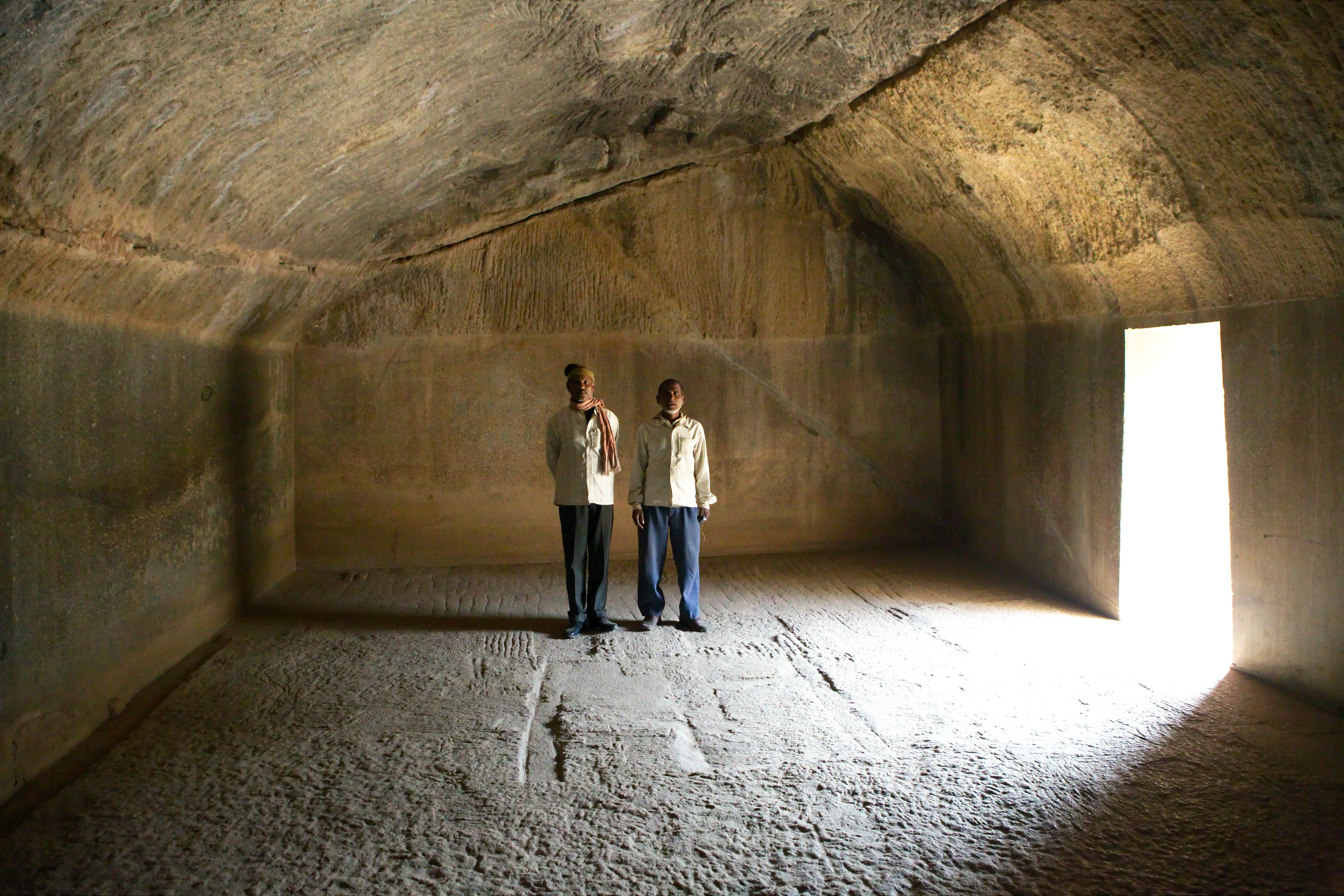
Unfinished interior (floor and ceiling) of Lomas Rishi cave. The rocky bumps left in the state on the ground appear in the farther left corner.

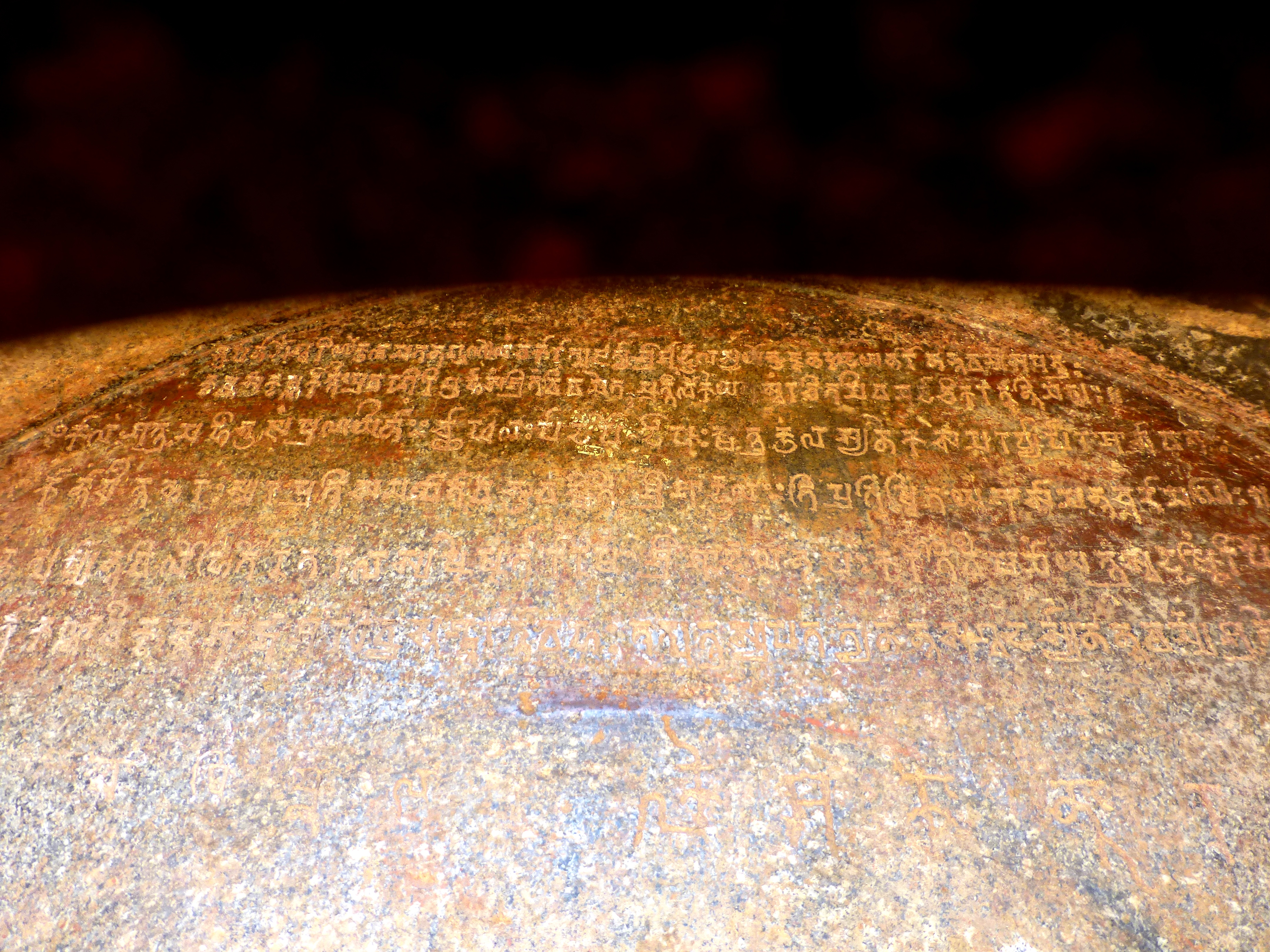
Inscription of Anantavarman above the entrance, 5th century of our era.

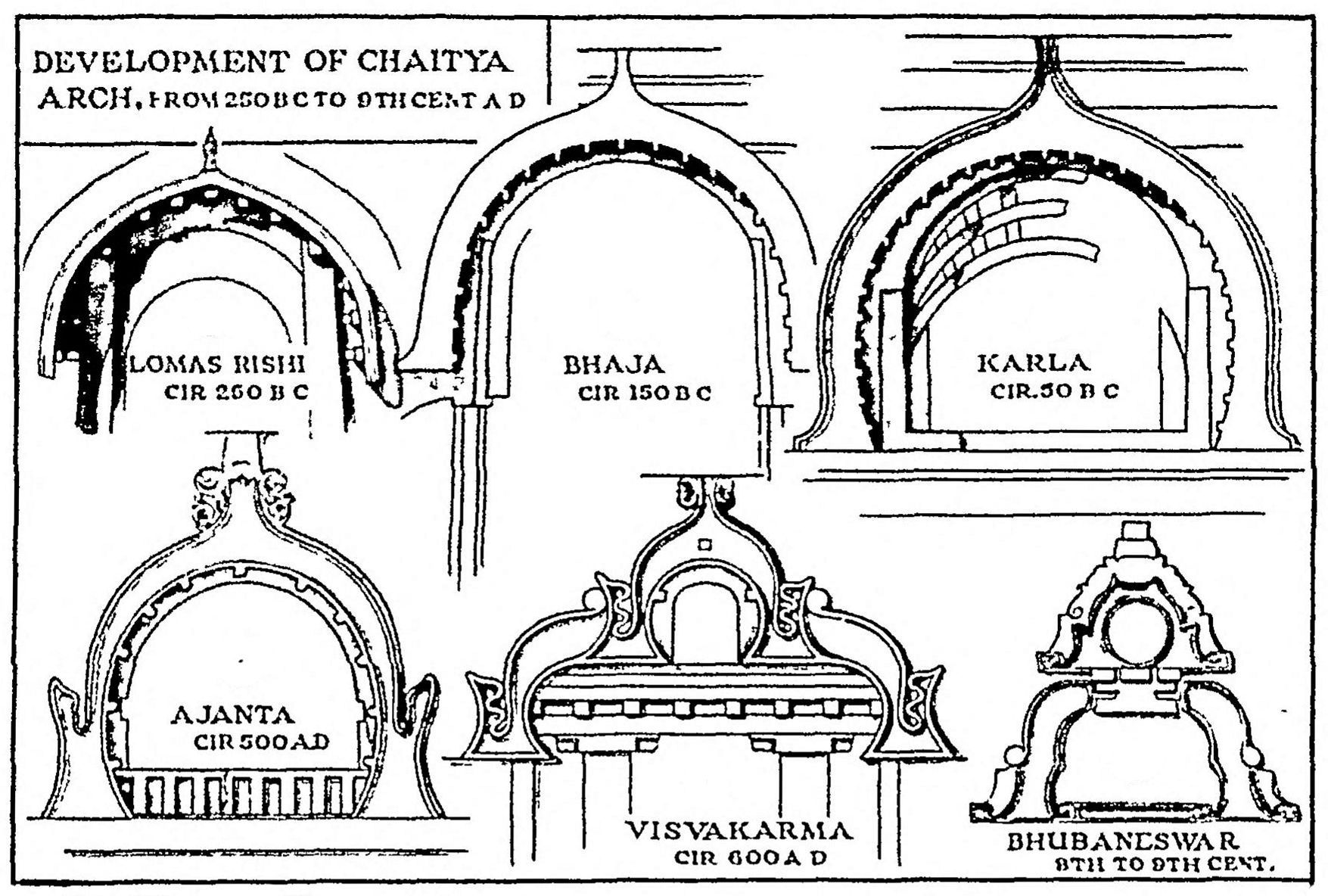
Development of the chaitya arch from Lomas Rishi Cave, from a book by Percy Brown.

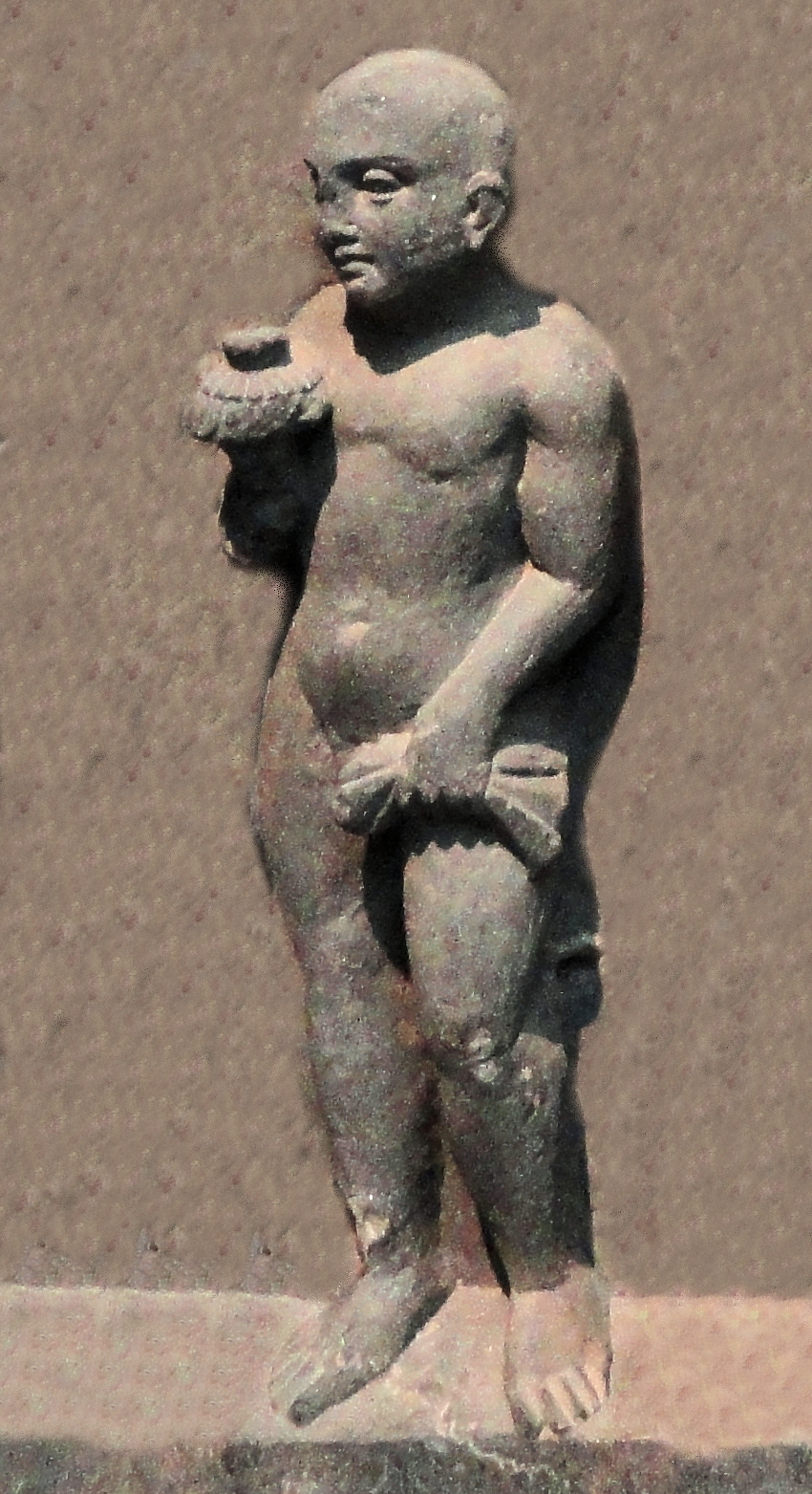
Most of the Barabar Caves were explicitly dedicated by Mauryan rulers to the sect of the Ājīvikas through inscriptions. Depiction of an Ājīvika ascetic in a Gandhara sculpture of the Mahaparinirvana, circa 2nd-3rd century CE

According to Gupta, the theory that Lomas Rishi would not have received Ashoka's inscription because it was in a state of incompleteness, is undermined by the fact that the cave of Vivaskarma, another cave of Barabar, although it is not finished, was nevertheless consecrated by Ashoka. The consecration of a cave could therefore be done in the course of work. This could imply that Lomas Rishi, with its bas-reliefs, actually post-dates Ashoka's reign.

Gupta actually believes that Lomas Rishi post-dates both Ashoka and his grandson Dasaratha, and would have been built at the end of the Maurya Empire, under the reign of its last Emperor Brihadratha, and abruptly halted in 185 BC with the assassination of Brihadratha and the coup d'état of Pushyamitra Sunga, founder of the Sunga dynasty. Pushyamitra Sunga is known to have persecuted Buddhists and Ajivikas, which could explain the immediate cessation of work. According to Gupta, the abrupt interruption of the works is suggested by the lack of finishing, even approximate, of the ground: for example, the abandonment in state of some rock pikes, which would have required only a few minutes of chipping to be removed in order to obtain a fairly regular floor.

==== Questions of date and religious affiliation ====
Ashoka dedicated the caves of Sudama and Visvakarma to the ascetics called "Ajivikas" in the 12th year of his reign, when his religious evolution towards Buddhism was not yet fully completed. The precise identity of the Ajivikas is not well known, and it is even unclear if they were a divergent sect of the Buddhists or the Jains.

Later, Ashoka built the caves of Lomas Rishi (without dated inscription, but posterior to Sudama on architectural grounds) and Karna Chopar (19th year of his reign) at a time when he had become a firm advocate of Buddhism, as known from his Edicts of Ashoka. It was initially thought that Karna Chopar may have been dedicated to the Buddhists, based on a former reading of the inscription at the entrance of the cave. However, in 2007, Indologist Harry Falk gave a new reading of the inscription indicating that Karna Chopar had been dedicated to the Ajivikas. Lomas Rishi has no dedicatory inscription, but it has been suggested that it may had been dedicated to the Buddhists, based on the fact that the architecture of the gate of Lomas Rishi became a reference for the development of the chaitya arch in Buddhist cave architecture for the following centuries, whereas the Hindus or the Jains caves essentially did not follow this architectural example. This implies that the decorated gate of Lomas Rishi was a Buddhist invention, emulated in Buddhist architecture in the following centuries. After the Barabar caves, the earliest known rock-cut Buddhist monasteries date to the 1st century BCE Kondivite Caves in the Western Ghats of India, and the Guntupalli Caves the in Eastern Ghats.

=== Sudama Cave ===
Sudama Cave
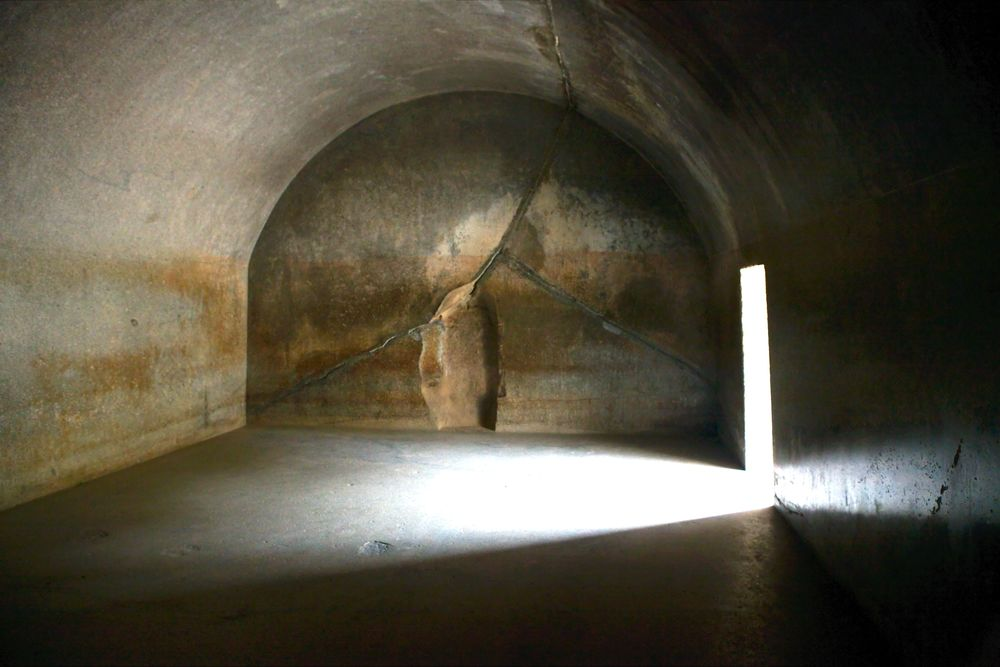
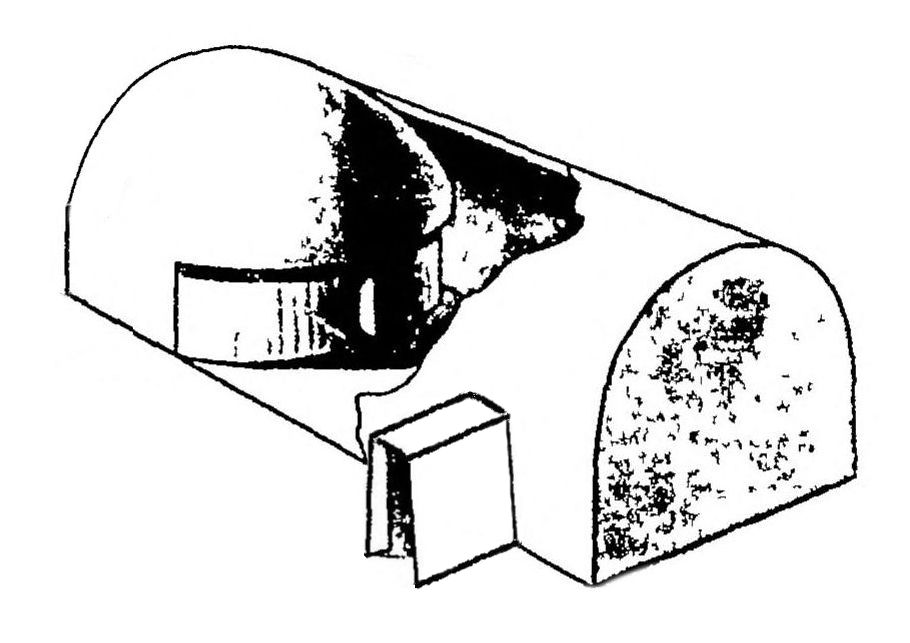
Sudama Cave (9.98x5.94m) has a large vaulted room and a semi-hemispherical sanctum (not in photo), with a polished granite finish. The cracks are from a slip in the rock.

The Sudama Cave is located on the southern side of Barabar granite hill, close and to the left of Lomas Rishi. Sudama consists of two rooms: a rectangular space measuring 9.98 x 5.94m, and a semi-hemispherical chamber 6m in diameter, accessed from the rectangular room by a narrow rectangular passage. This is probably the first cave in the group to have been dug. This cave was dedicated by Emperor Ashoka in 257 BCE (12th year of his reign) as evidenced by an inscription in Brahmi using his protocol name (Priyadarsin, "He who brings joy") found in the entrance of the cave, whereas the cave of Lomas Rishi did not receive a dedicatory inscription.

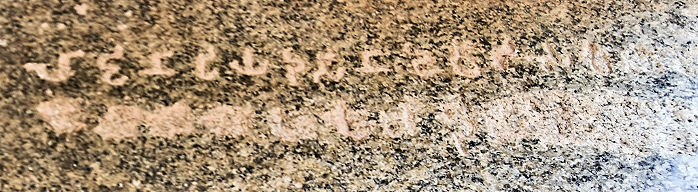
𑀮𑀸𑀚𑀺𑀦𑀸 𑀧𑀺𑀬𑀤𑀲𑀺𑀦 𑀤𑀼𑀯𑀟 𑀯𑀲𑀪𑀺𑀲𑀺𑀢𑁂𑀦𑀸
𑀇𑀬𑀁 𑀦𑀺𑀕𑁄𑀳𑀓𑀼𑀪𑀸 𑀤𑀺𑀦 𑀆𑀚𑀺𑀯𑀺𑀓𑁂𑀳𑀺
Lājinā Piyadasinā duvāḍasa-[vasābhisitenā] / [iyaṁ Nigoha]-kubhā di[nā ājivikehi]
"By King Priyadarsin, in the 12th year of his reign, this cave of Banyans was offered to the Ajivikas."

— Ashoka inscription of the cave of Sudama

The ceiling of the Sudama Cave is arched. The cave is composed of a circular vaulted chamber and a vaulted room with the rectangular form of mandapa. The interior walls of the cave represent a technical feat: they are perfectly flat with polished granite surfaces that create a mirrored effect. The flat, mirror-plane surfaces reverberate sound, creating a very pronounced echo phenomenon, amplifying vibrations and harmonies, and may have been favorable to the songs or chanting of the monks.

All Barabar's caves share this polished interior to a greater or lesser extent, with the exception of Lomas Rishi Cave, whose interior, although designed on the same model as the others, is only half-finished.

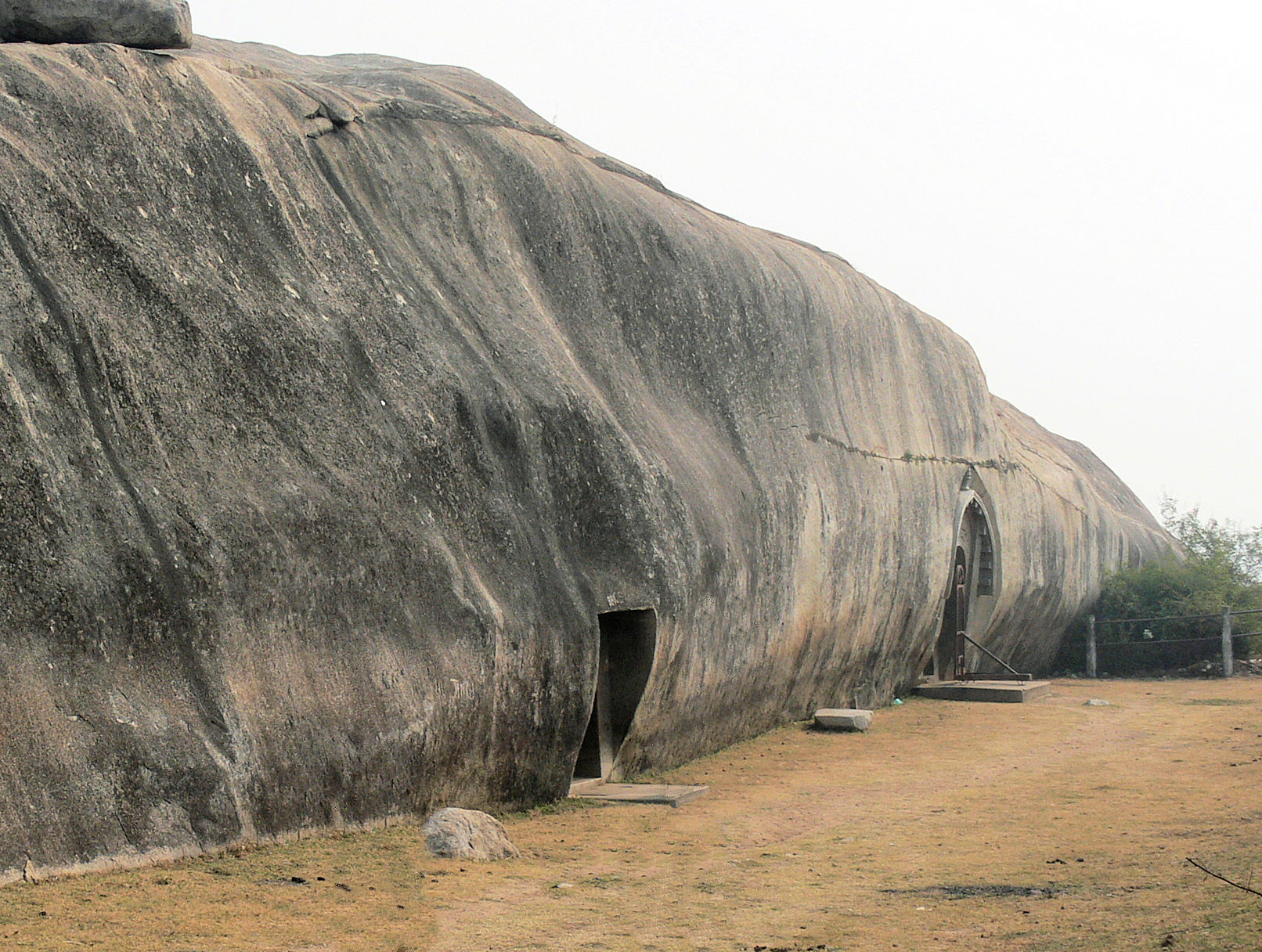
Entrance of Sudama Cave in the forefront, Barabar Hill

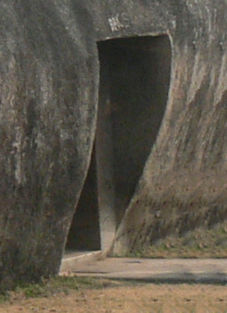
Entrance to the Sudama Cave

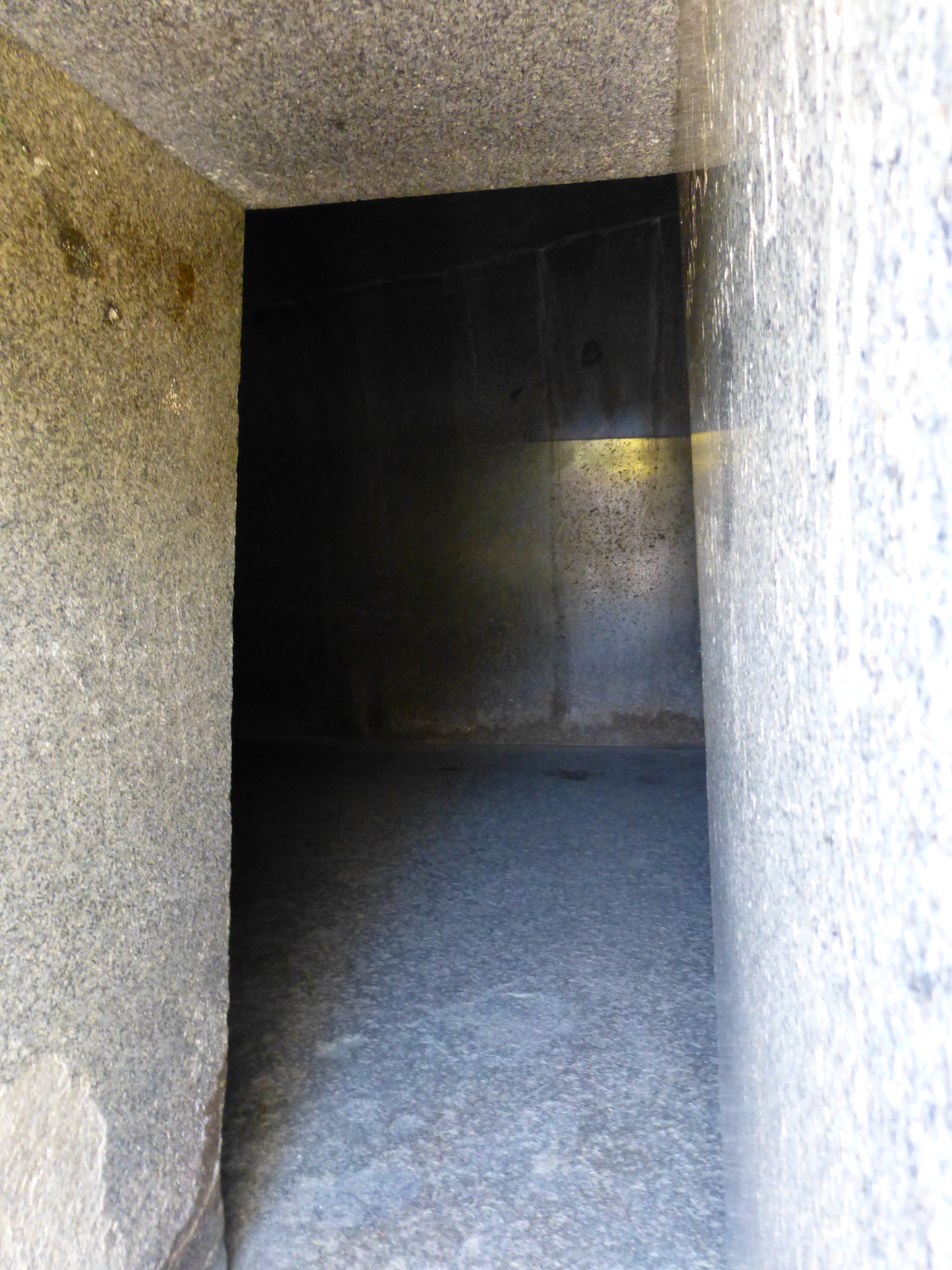
Entrance corridor of the Sudama Cave

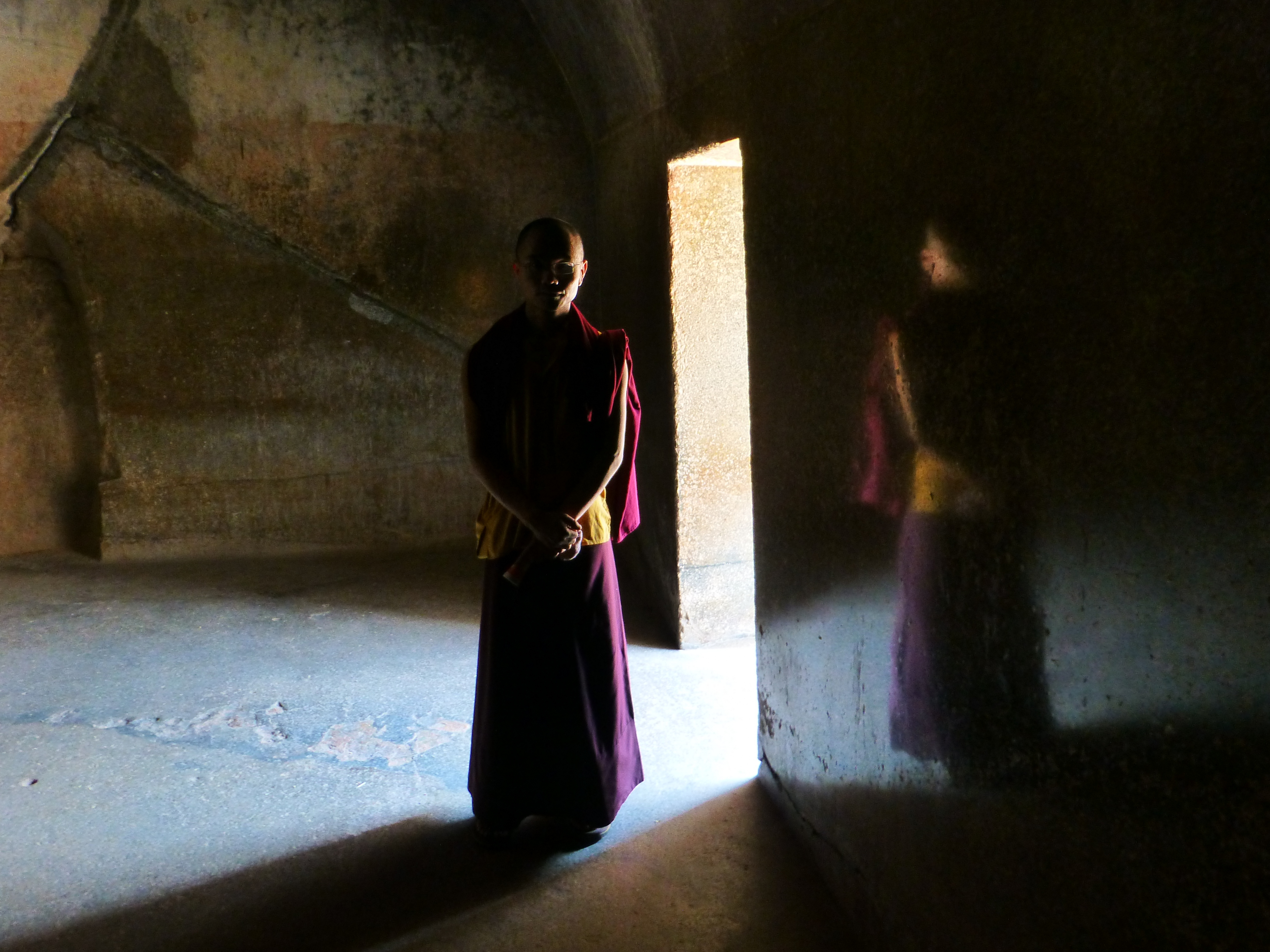
The interior wall consists of perfectly polished granite surfaces (visible reflection).

=== Karan Chaupar Cave ===
Karan Chaupar Cave
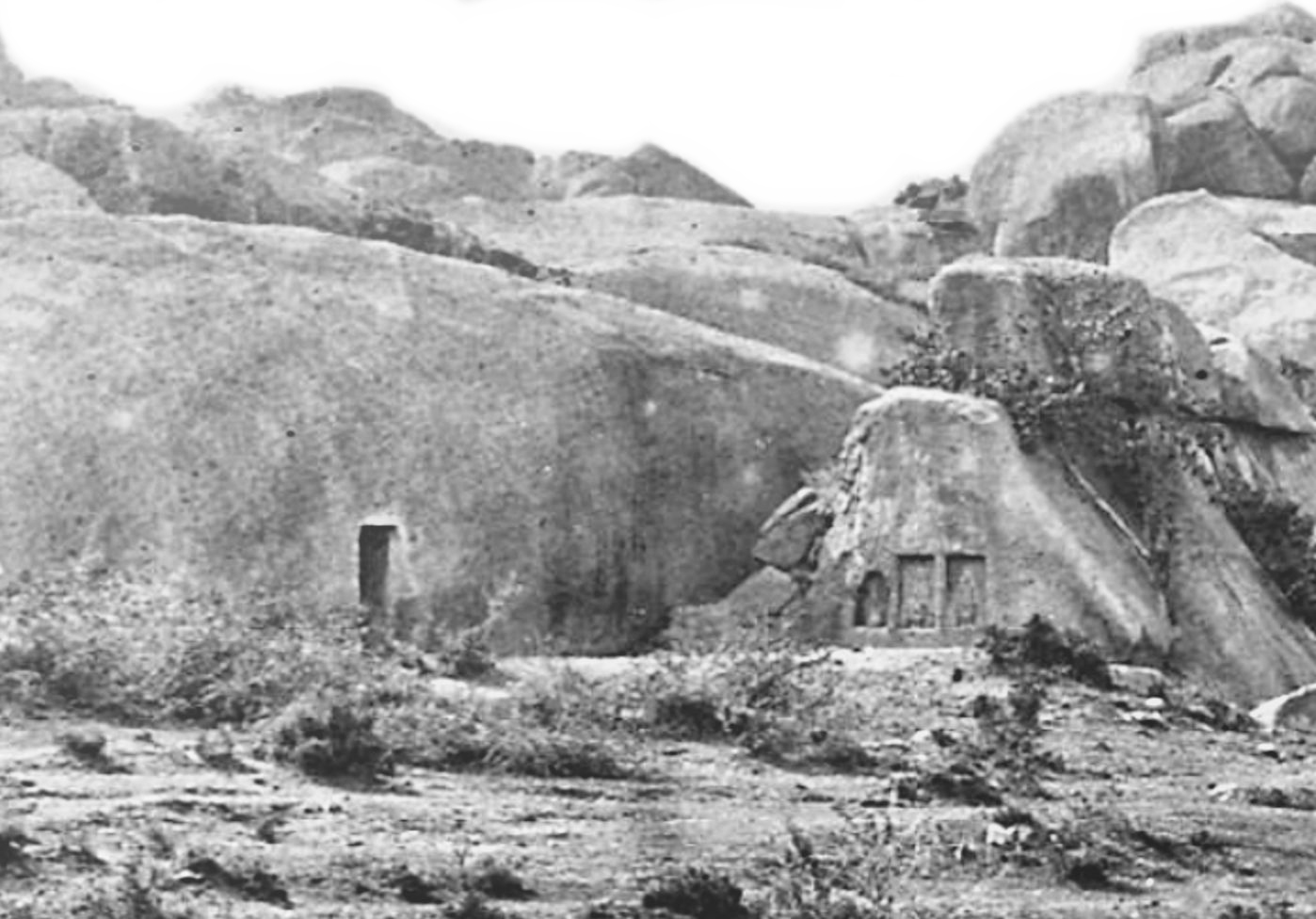
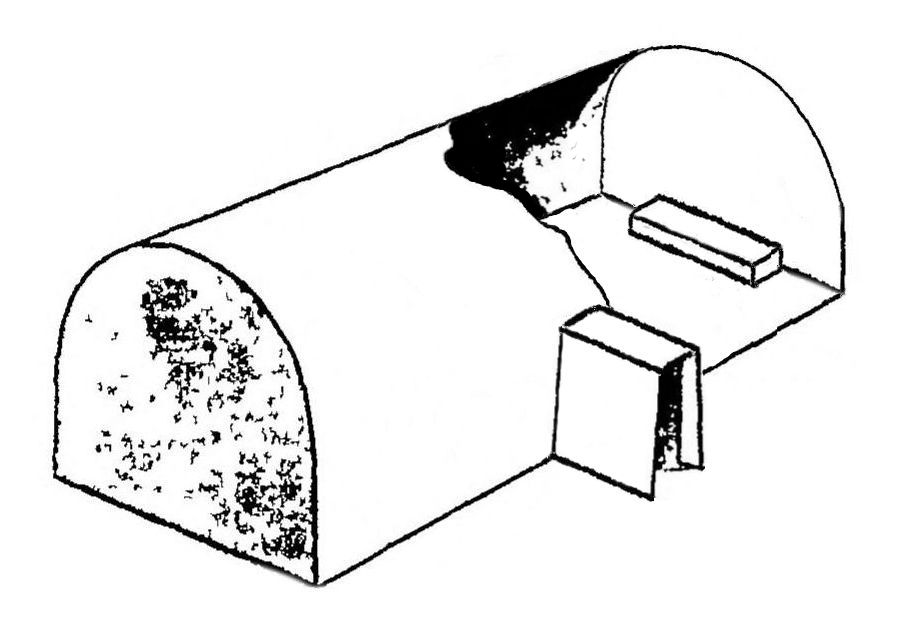
Photograph and volume plan of the Karan Chaupar Cave (10.2x4.27m).

Karan Chaupar, also known as Karna Chaupar, is on the northern side of the Barabar granite hill. It consists of a single rectangular room with polished surfaces, 10.2 x 4.27m. An inscription by Ashoka dating from the 19th year of his reign, about 250 BCE, is located outside and immediately to the right of the entrance. Initially, it was thought from E. Hultzsch's 1925 translation that Ashoka's inscription from Karna Chopar Cave does not mention the Ajivikas, and seems rather to refer to the Buddhist practice of retirement (vassavasa) during the rainy season. In addition, the inverted swastika with upward arrow at the end of the inscription would be more of a Buddhist character. All this suggested that this cave was planned for Buddhist monks. However, in 2007, Indologist Harry Falk showed with a new reading of the inscription that the cave was indeed dedicated to the Ajivikas.

Traditional reading of the inscription:

"In my 19th year of reign, I, King Priyadarsin,
offered this cave of the very pleasant mountain of
Khalatika, to serve as shelter during the rainy
season."

— Ashoka inscription from Karan Chaupar cave. Translation by E. Hultzsch, 1925.

This reading of the inscription has been corrected by Harry Falk, who, after cleaning the stone and inspecting it, read:

"When King Priyadarsin had been annointed 19 years,
he went to Jalūṭha and then this cave (called) Supriyekṣā,
was given to the Ajivikas."

— Ashoka inscription from Karan Chaupar cave. Translation by Harry Falk, 2007.

In particular, Falk reconstructs the last line as 𑀲𑀼𑀧𑀺𑀬𑁂𑀔𑀆𑀚𑀺𑀯𑀺𑀓𑁂𑀳𑀺𑀤𑀺𑀦𑀸 (Su[p]i[y]ekha (Ajivikehi) dinā), which means "Supriyekṣā was given to the Ājivikas".

The cave has a rock-cut bench at one end, probably to sit or sleep upon.

In the entrance hall an inscription from the Gupta period mentions "Daridra Kantara" ("The Cave of the Beggars"). A mound decorated with later Buddhist sculptures is also near the entrance, another element which suggested the belonging of this cave to the Buddhists.

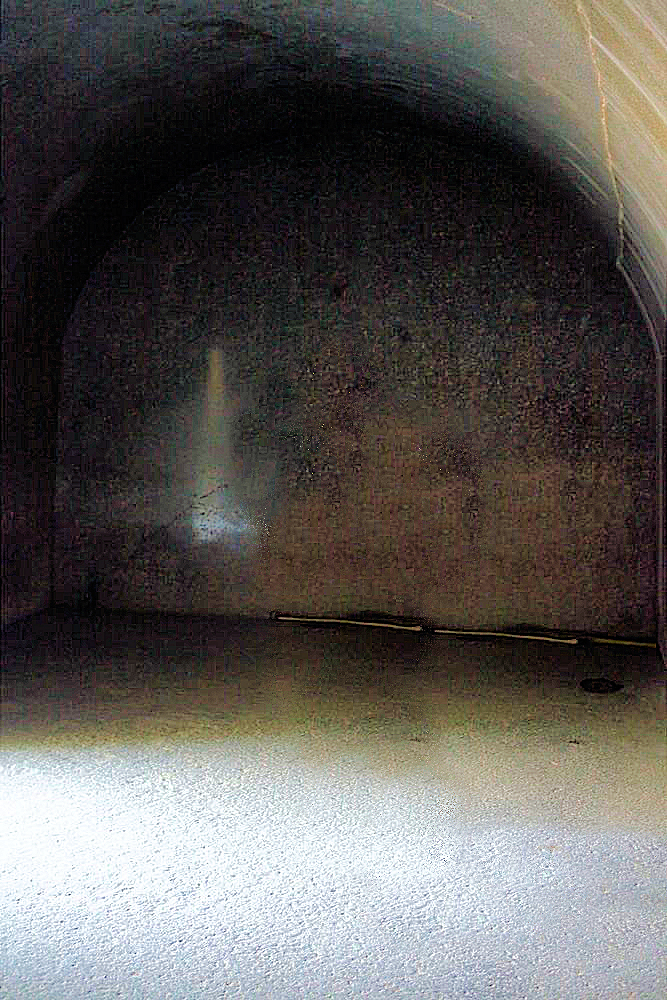
Interior

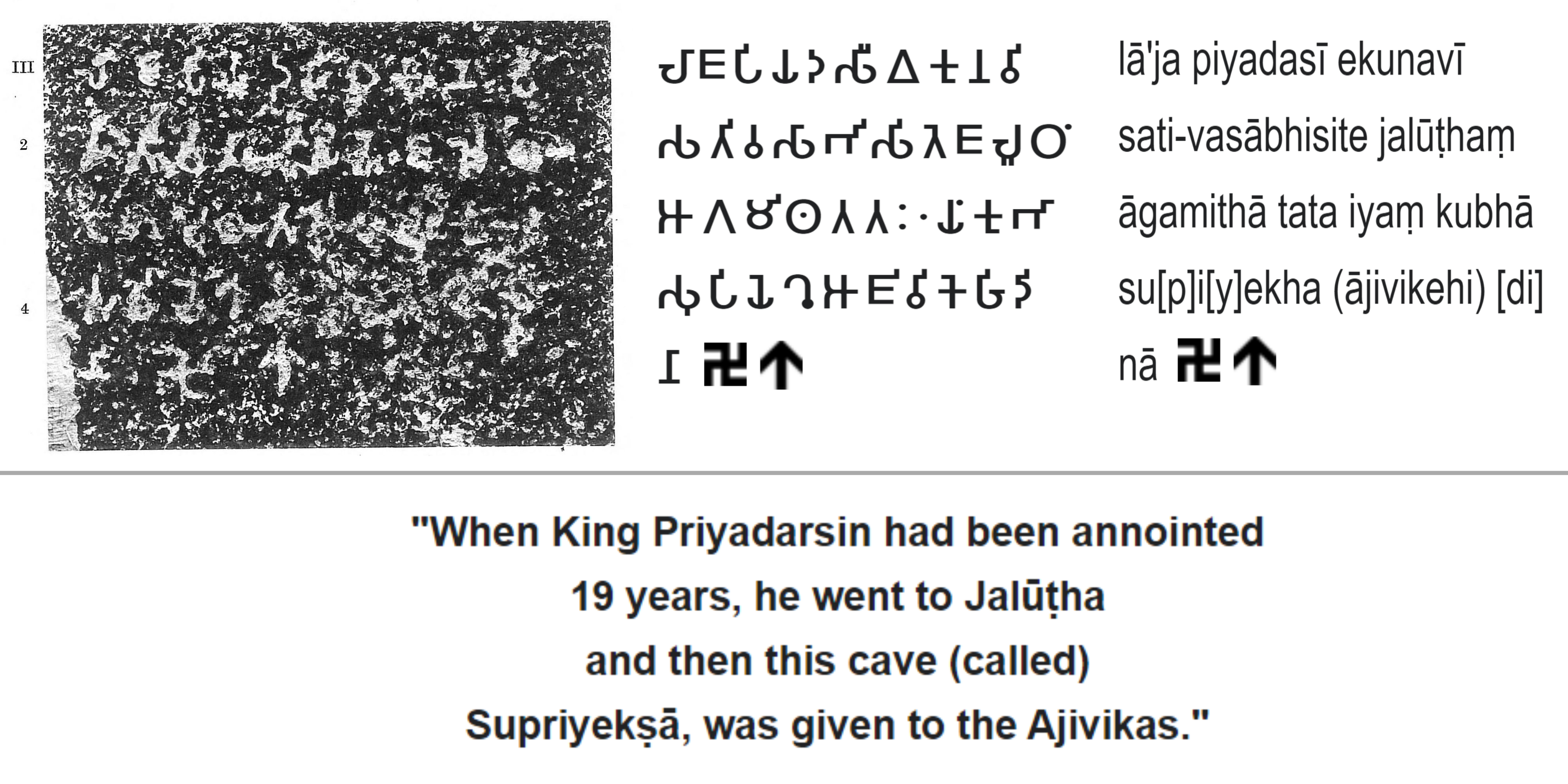
Dedicatory inscription by Ashoka to the Ajivikas

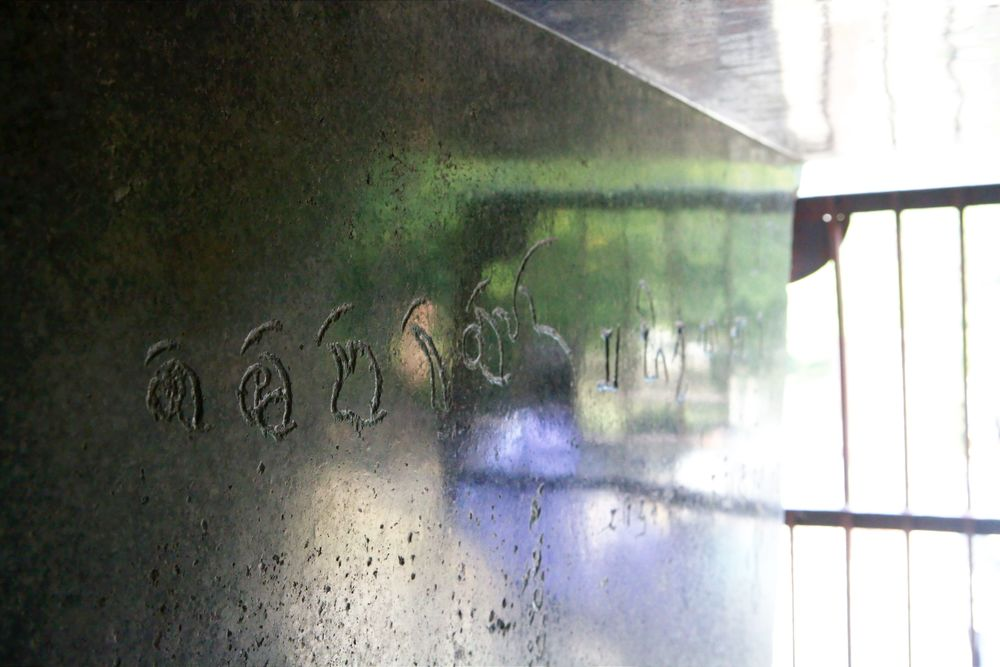
Inscription from the Gupta period (in the background) mentioning "Daridra Kantara" ("The Cave of the Beggars").

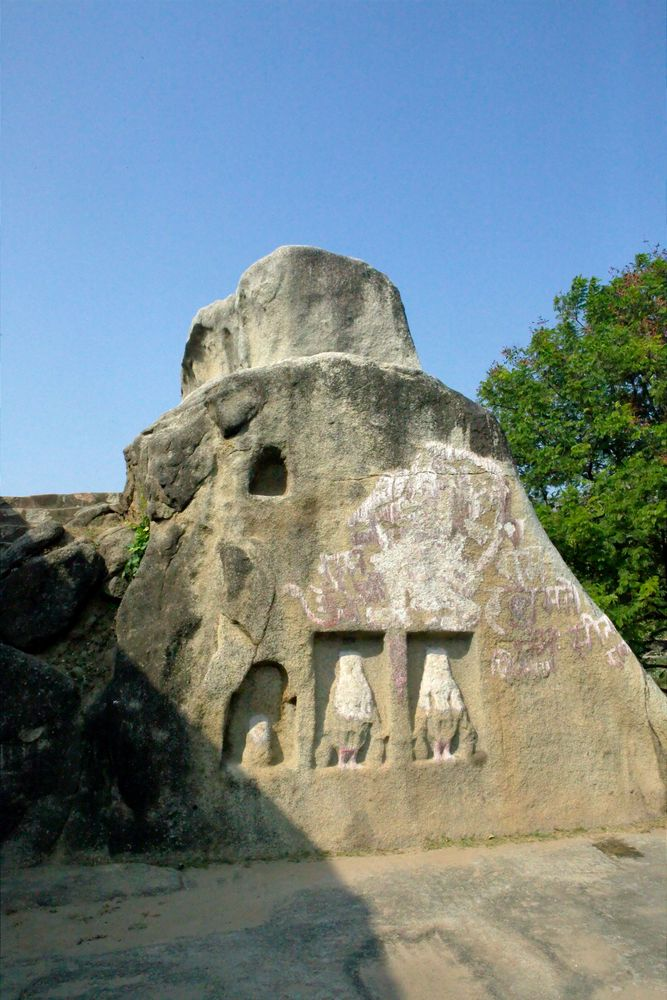
Buddhist reliefs on the outside of Karna Chaupar.

=== Visvakarma Cave ===
Visvakarma Cave
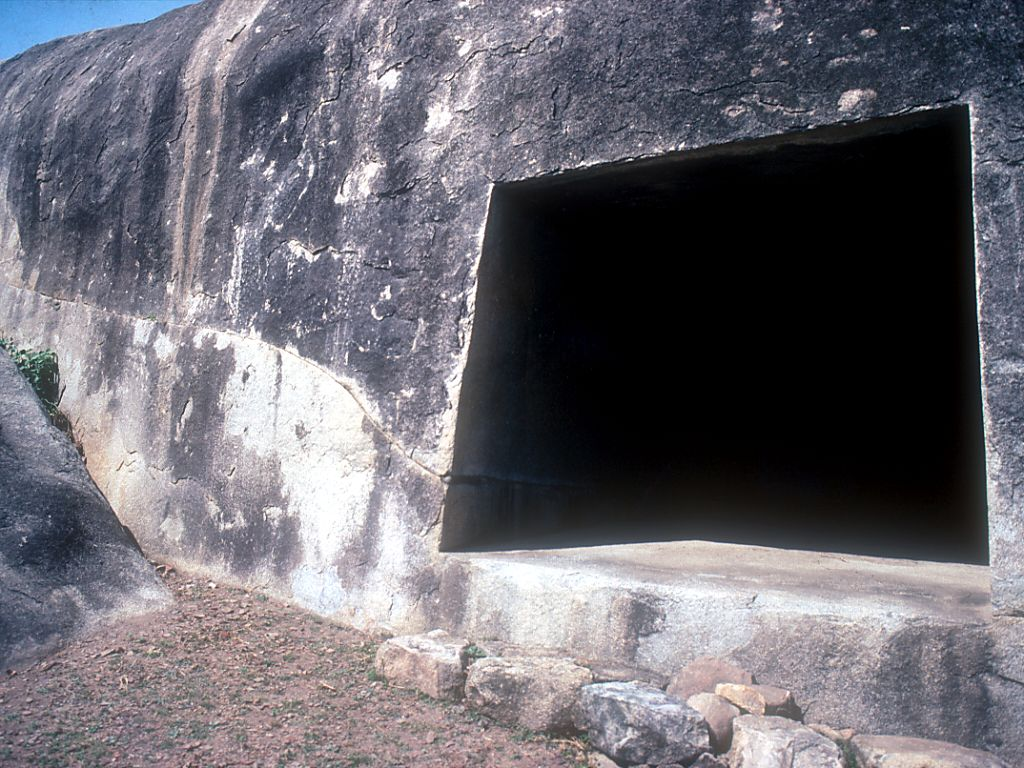
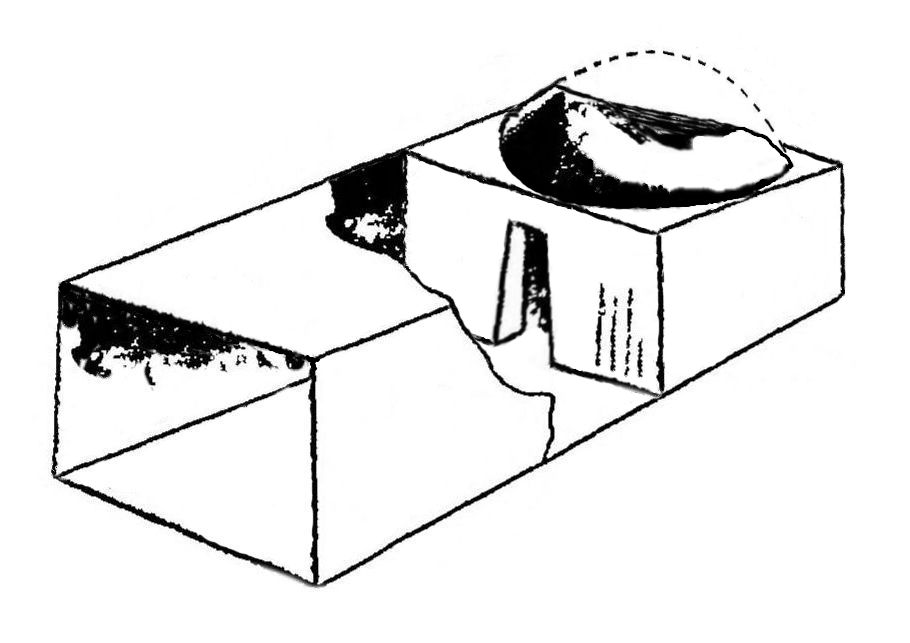
Photograph and volume plan of the Barabar Vivaskarma Cave (4.27 x 2.54m)

The Visvakarma Cave, also called Viswa Mitra, is accessible by the "steps of Ashoka" carved into the cliff. The cave sits a hundred meters and a little east of the main granite hill 25°00′22″N 85°03′53″E. It consists of a rectangular room entirely open to the outside, a sort of elongated porch, and an unfinished semi-hemispherical room. The rectangular space measures 4.27 x 2.54m, and the circular room, entered through a narrow trapezoidal passage, is 2.8m in diameter. On the floor of the porch, four holes were made, which are thought to allow the cave to be closed with a wooden picket fence.

The cave of Visvakarma was offered by Ashoka to the Ajivikas in the year 12 of his reign, about 261 BCE:

"By King Priyadarsin, in the 12th year of his reign, this cave of Khalatika Mountain was offered to the Ajivikas. "

— - Ashoka inscription from Visvakarma Cave

Visvakarma Cave was consecrated by Ashoka despite the fact that it was unfinished. This somewhat questions the theory that the Lomas Rishi cave did not receive Ashoka's inscription because it was incomplete. This could support the notion that Lomas Rishi, with its bas-reliefs, is post-Ashoka, as late as 185 BCE. This does not explain, however, why work on Visvakarma cave, consecrated in 260 BCE, was interrupted in the absence of a significant problem in the rock, and why Ashoka dedicated Karan Chaupar cave, perfectly finished and only a short distance away, 7 years later. Visvakarma is also the only cave that does not have "historical" inscriptions after Ashoka.

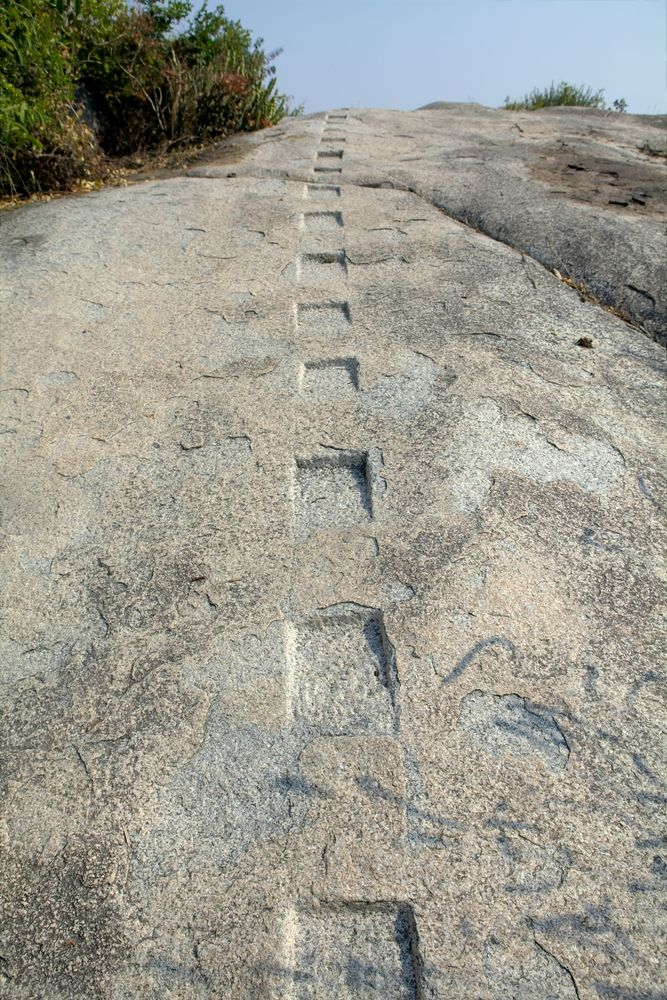
The "Ashoka stairs" leading to Visvakarma.

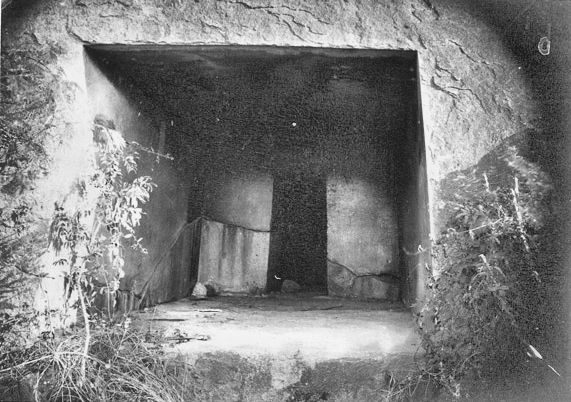
The entrance and internal passage.

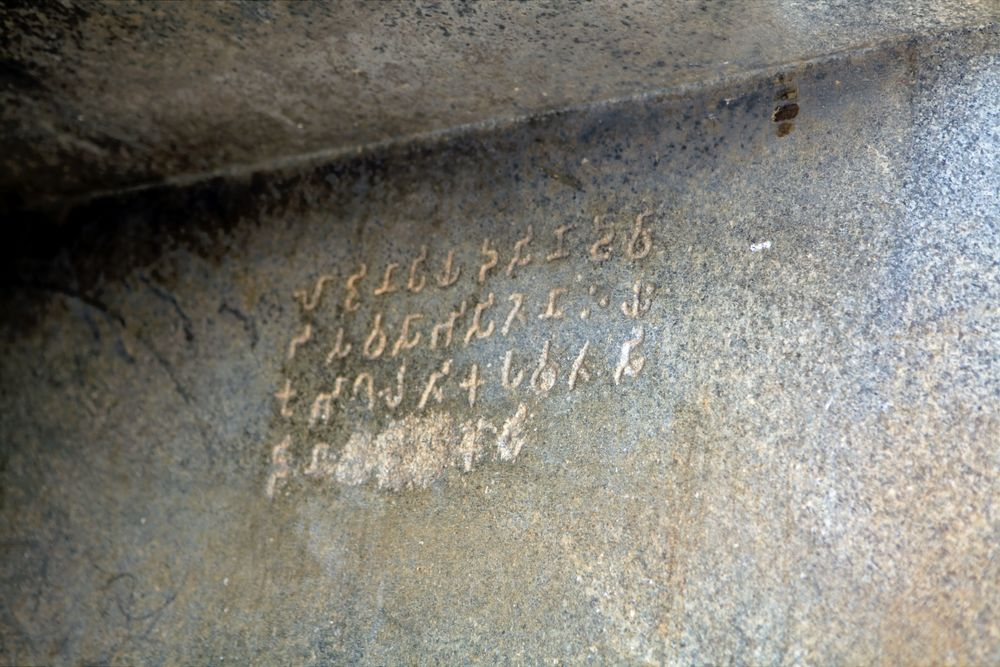
Dedicatory inscription by Ashoka.

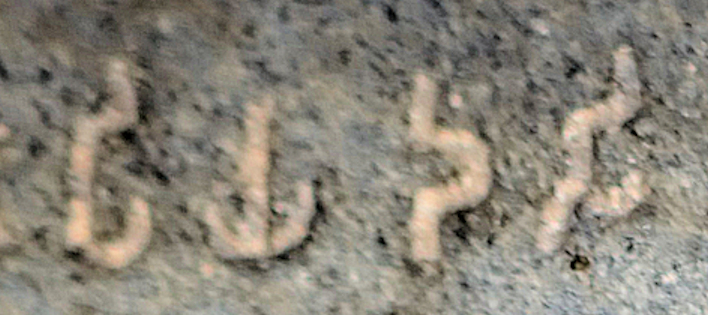
"Piyadasi", honorific name of Ashoka, in Brahmi script.

== Nagarjuni Caves ==
Gopika Cave
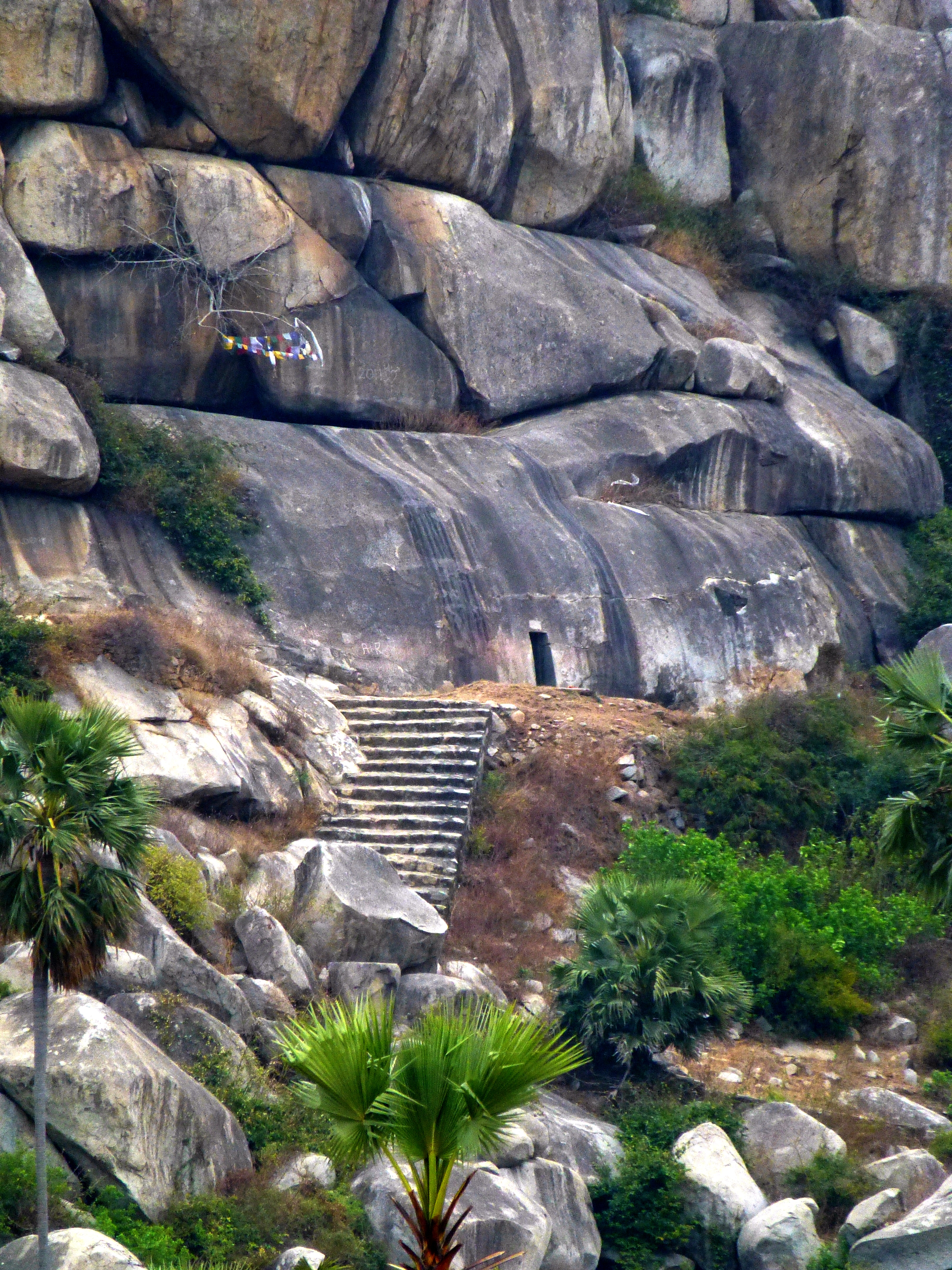
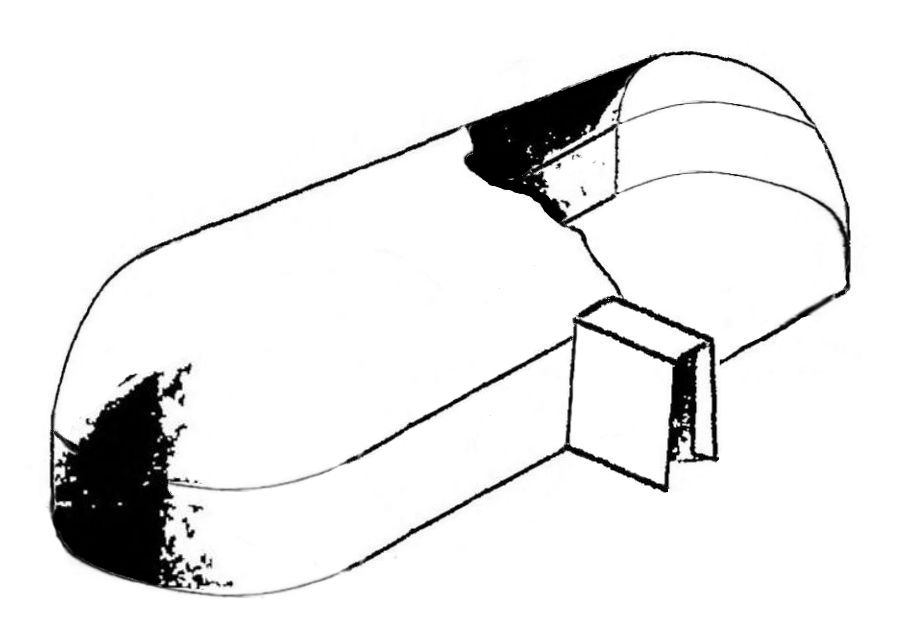
Photograph of the stairs to Gopika Cave, and entrance of the cave, in Nagarjuni hill. Volume plan of Gopika Cave (13.95x5.84m).

The nearby caves of Nagarjuni hill were built a few decades later than the Barabar Caves, and consecrated by Dasaratha Maurya, Ashoka's grandson and successor, for the Ajivikas sect. Carved from granite 1.6 kilometers east of Barabar, the three caves are:

- Gopika (Gopi-ka-Kubha), on the southside of the hill, excavated by king Dasharatha, grandson of Ashoka, according to an inscription.
- Vadithi-ka-Kubha cave, on the northside of the hill, located in a crevice.
- Vapiya-ka-Kubha cave, on the northside of the hill.

=== Gopika Cave ===
Also called Gopi or Gopi-ka-Kubha or simply Nagarjuni, Gopika Cave is the largest of all the caves of the Barabar complex (25.009116°N 85.078427°E). It consists of a single large oblong room of 13.95 x 5.84m. The two ends of the room have the particularity of being circular, contrary to the other caves. The cave lies on the south bank of the hill, and commissioned by Dasharatha, grandson of Emperor Ashoka, according to the inscription above the front door:

"The cave of Gopika, a refuge that will last as long as the sun and the moon, was dug by Devanampiya (beloved of the gods) Dasaratha during his elevation to the throne, to make a hermitage for the most pious Ajivikas "

— Inscription of Dasaratha Maurya on the cave of Gopika. About 230 BCE.

The cave also has the "Gopika Cave Inscription" in the entrance corridor, dated to the 5-6th century CE.

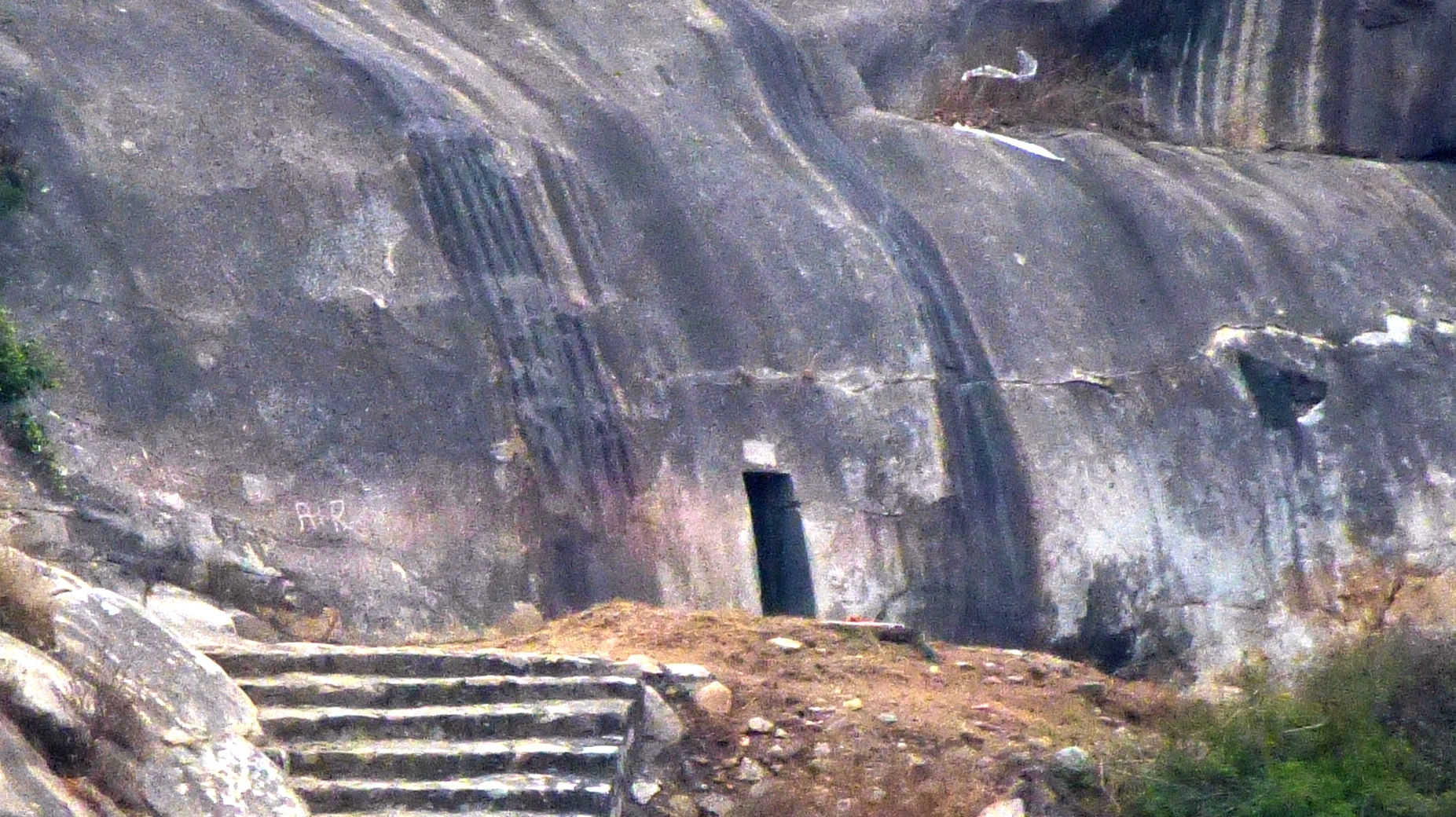
Front of the cave. Photos.

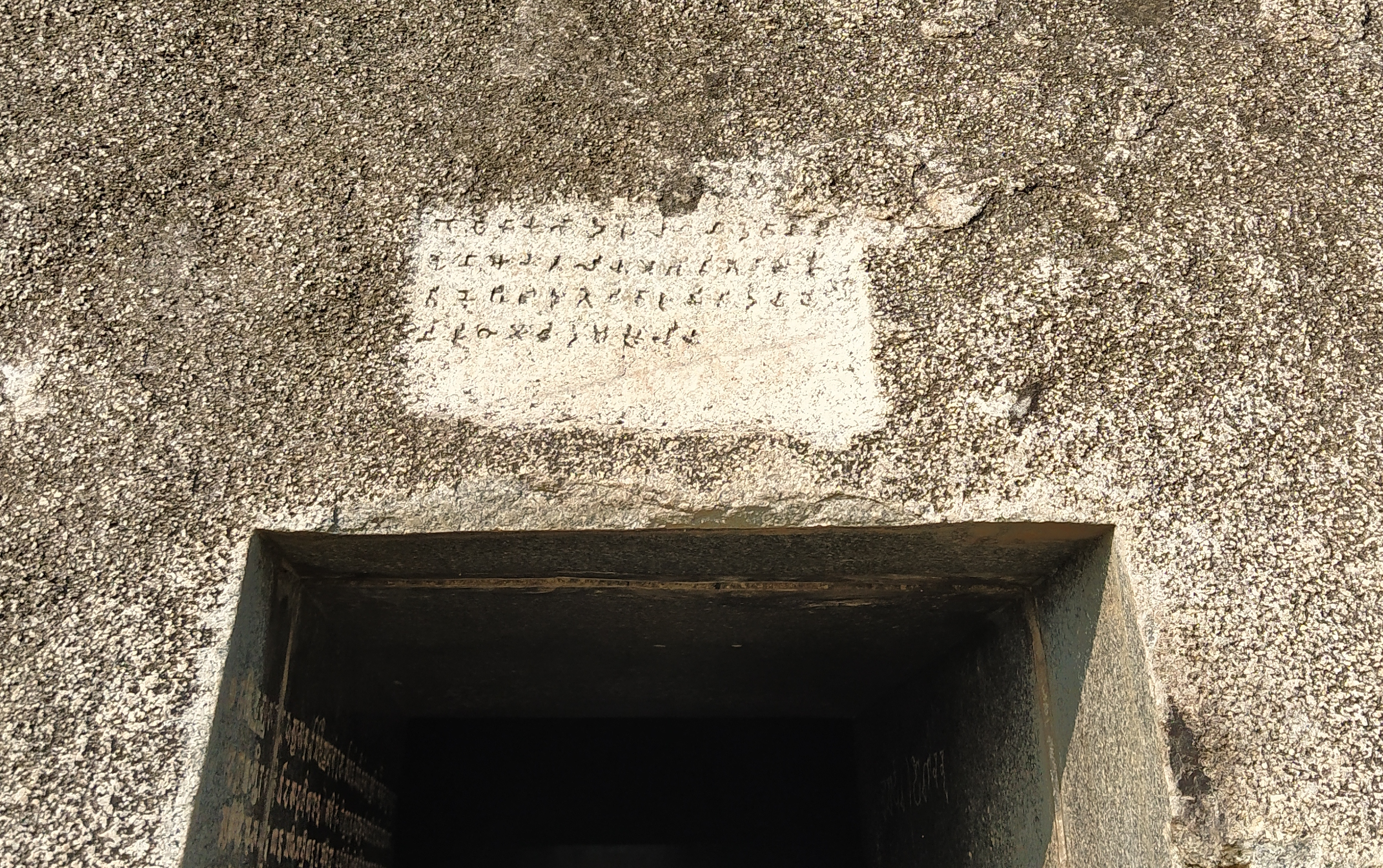
Dedicatory inscription by Dasaratha Maurya, grandson of Ashoka, on top of the entrance. Circa 230 BCE.

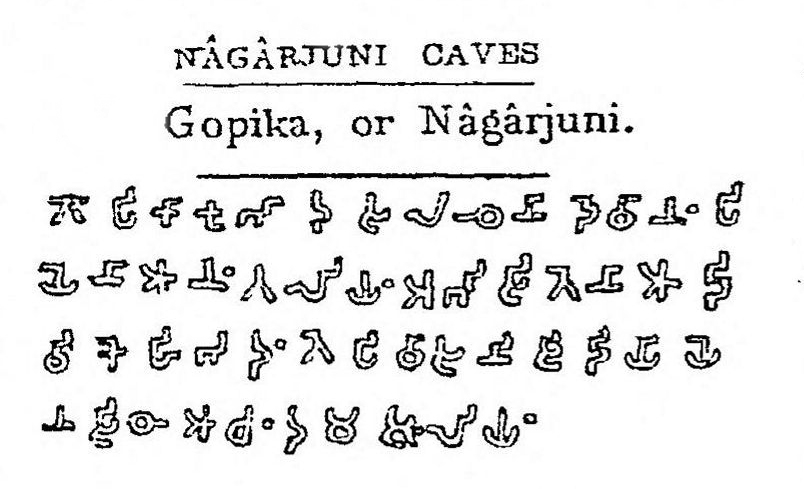
Transcription of the inscription by Dasaratha Maurya.

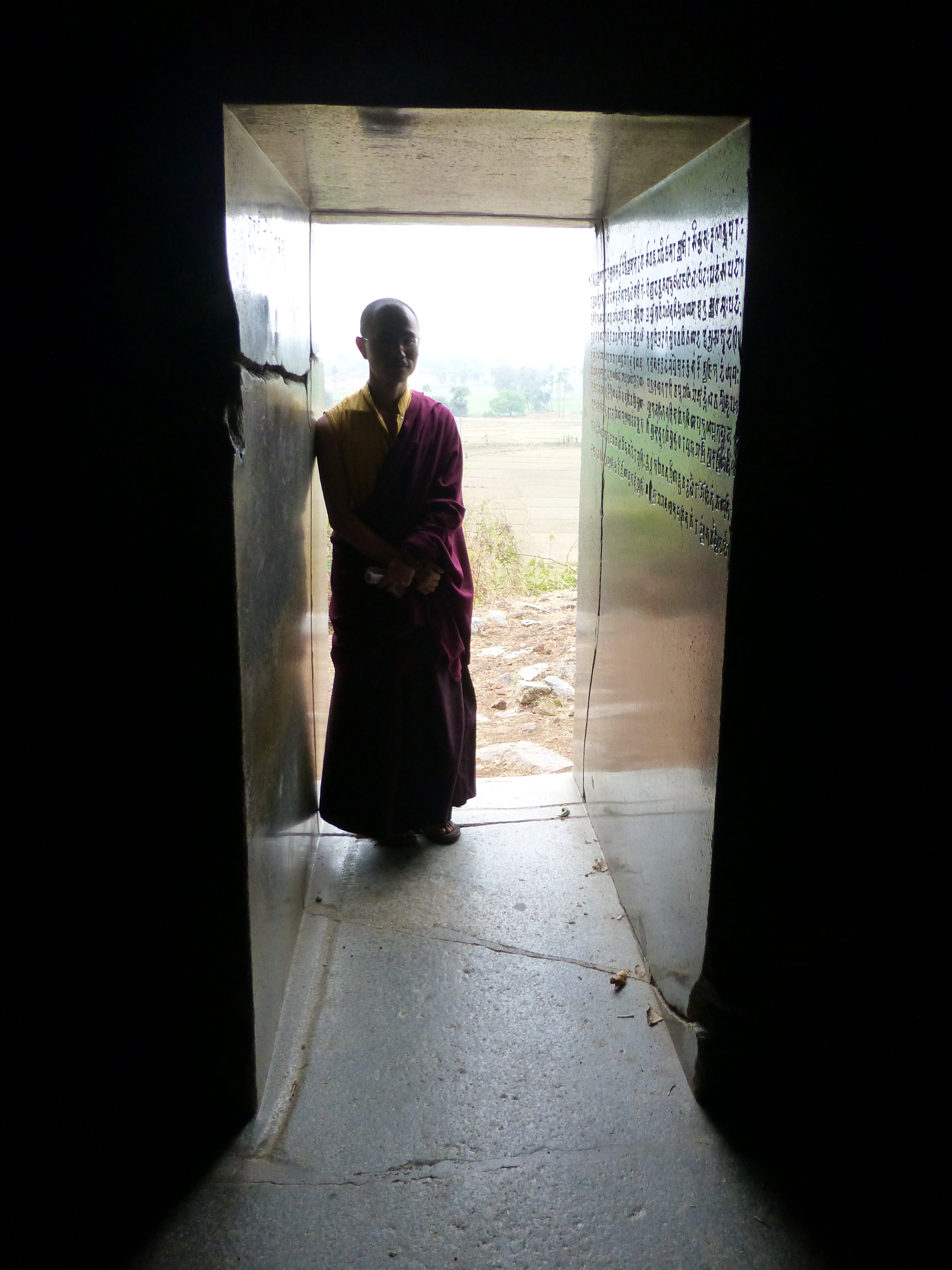
Entrance corridor, polished walls with the Gopika Cave Inscription of the 5th century CE.

=== Vadathika and Vapiyaka caves ===
Vadathika and Vapiyaka caves
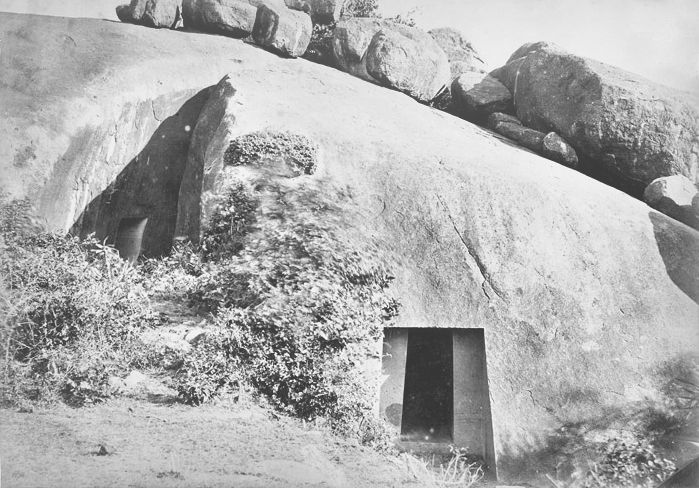
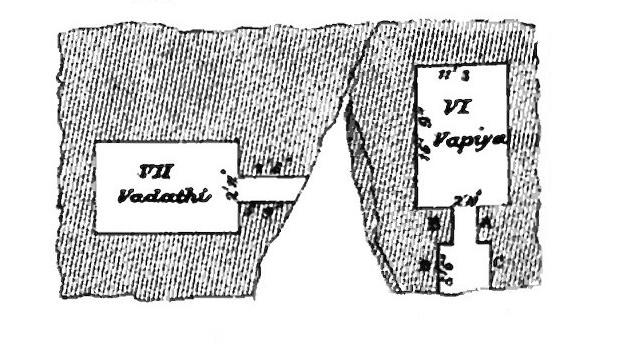
Vadathika Cave (left) and Vapiyaka Cave (right), and plan of the two caves Photos

These two caves are a little higher on the north side of the hill, 300m away in a straight line (25.011261°N 85.076963°E). Although small, they are very beautiful and firmly carved.

- Vadathika Cave, located in a rock crevasse, consists of a single rectangular room sized 5.11m x 3.43m, with a porch at the entrance of 1.83m x 1.68m. This cave was consecrated by Dasharatha Maurya, grandson and immediate successor of Ashoka, for the Ajivikas.

The cave of Vadathika, a refuge that will last as long as the sun and the moon, was dug by Devanampiya (beloved of the gods) Dasaratha during his elevation to the throne, to make it a hermitage for the most pious Ajivikas

— Inscription of Dasharatha Maurya on the cave of Vadathika. About 230 BCE.

The cave also bears the much-later Hindu Vadathika Cave Inscription.

- Vapiyaka Cave, also called "Well Cave" from the meaning of its name, a single rectangular room of dimensions 5.10m x 3.43m. Dedicated to the Ajivikas by Dasharatha, with an inscription similar to that of Gopika. This cave has a beautiful vaulted hall, made of perfectly polished granite, as well as a number of short inscriptions of the Gupta era (3rd-6th CE).
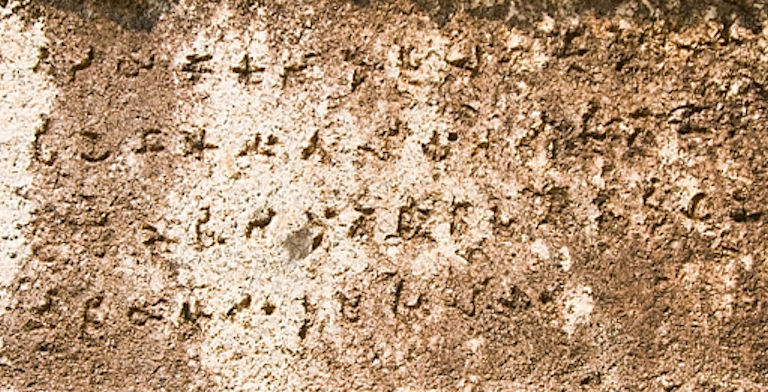
Dasaratha dedicatory inscription on top of the entrance of Vadathika cave. 3rd century BCE.

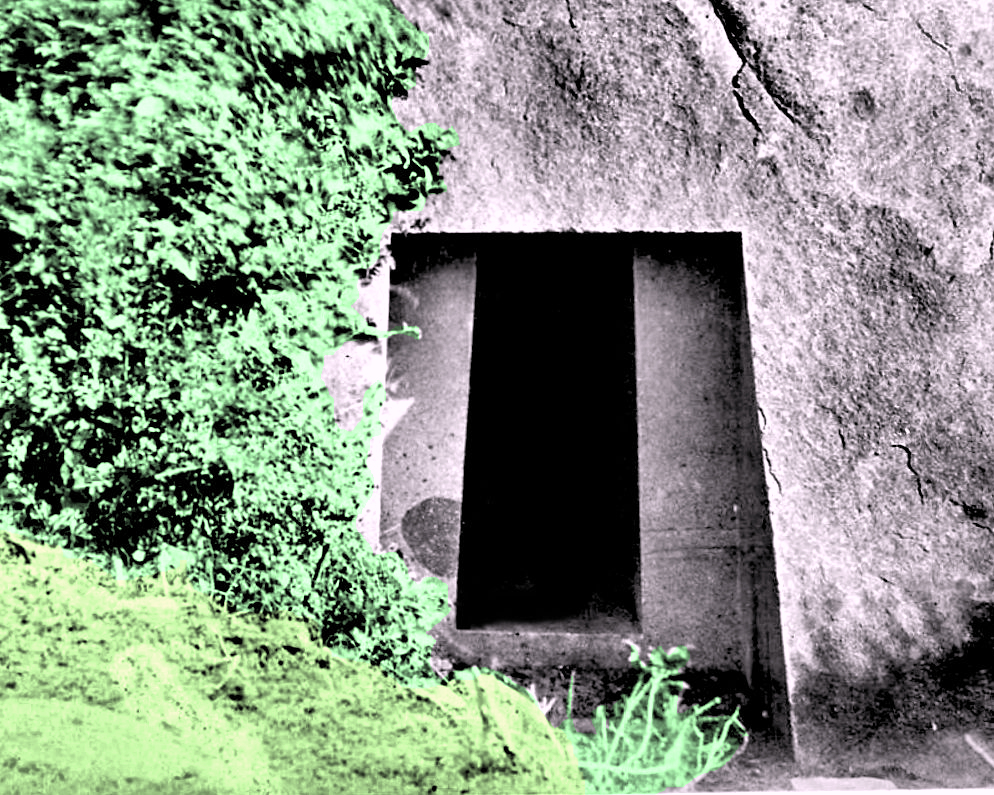
Entrance of Vapiyaka cave.

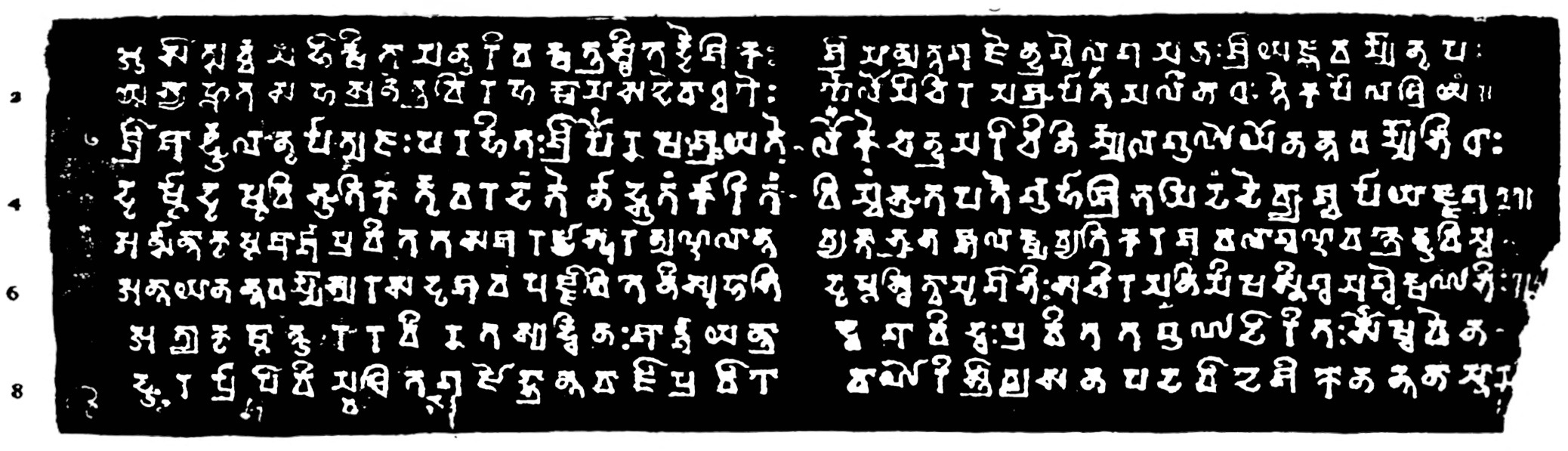
Vadathika Cave Inscription, 5th-6th CE.

== Technology ==
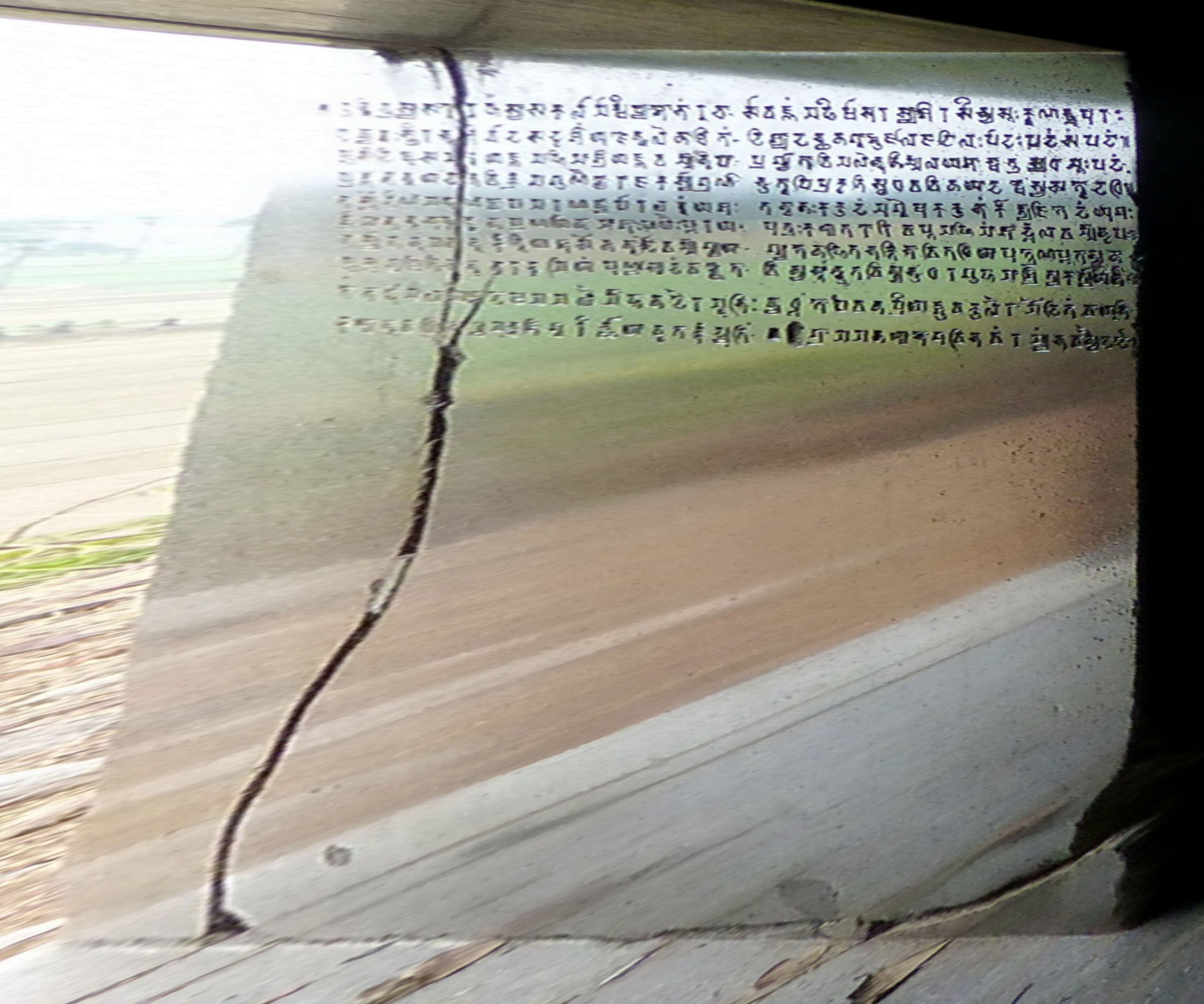
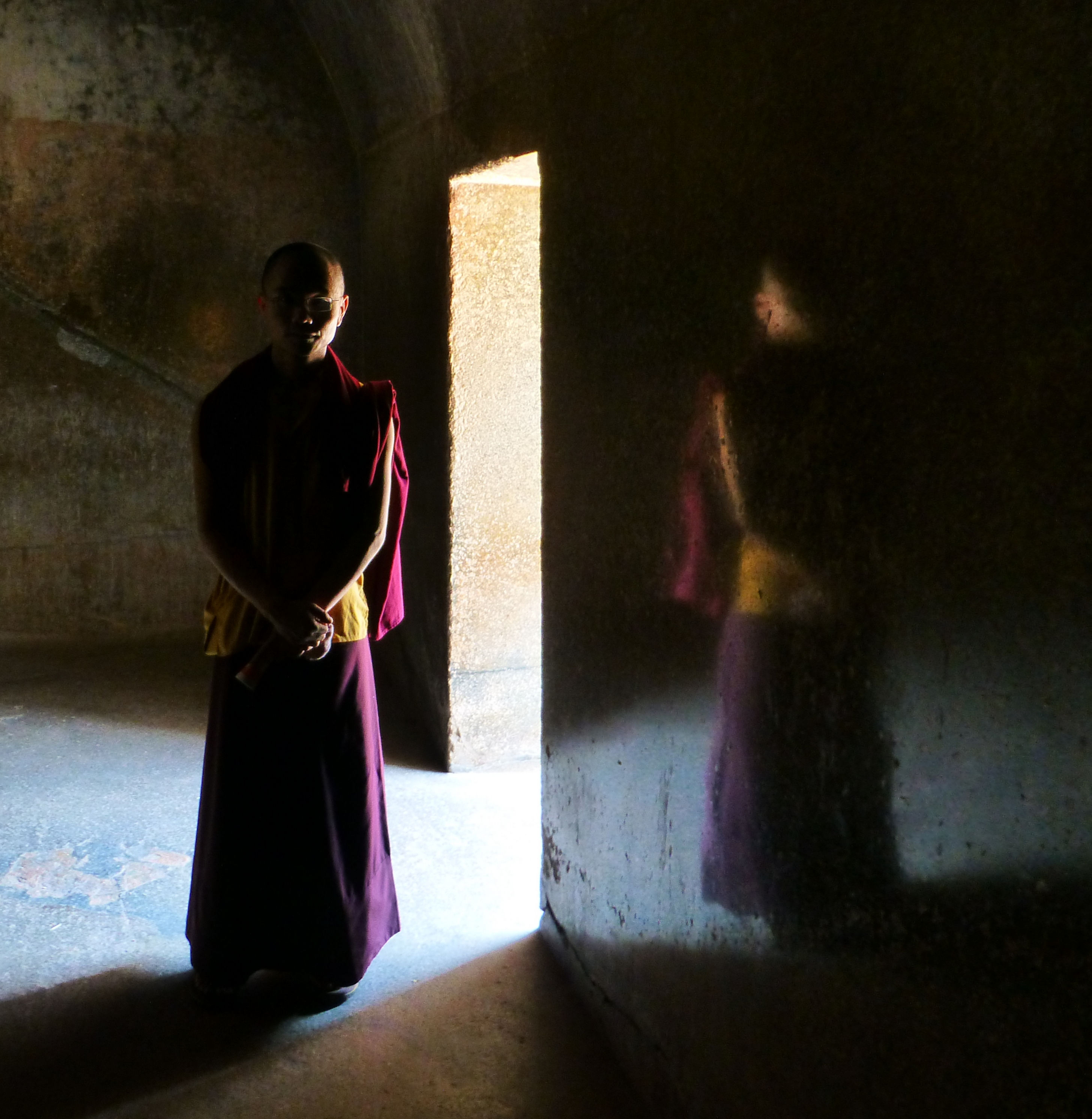
Mirror-like polishing of the granite walls. Left: wall of the entrance corridor to the cave of Gopika (mirror effect increased by the low shooting angle). Right: interior of the Sudama Cave with reflection of a monk. These quasi-perfect walls were dug into the hard rock and polished before 261 BCE, date of the inscriptions of Ashoka.

The caves were carved out of granite, an extremely hard rock, then finished with a very nice polishing of the inner surface, giving a mirror effect of a great regularity, as well as an echo effect. This large-scale polish is reminiscent of polishing on smaller surfaces of the Maurya statuary, particularly visible on the pillars and capitals of the Ashoka pillars.

Commenting of Mauryan sculpture, John Marshall once wrote about the "extraordinary precision and accuracy which characterizes all Mauryan works, and which has never, we venture to say, been surpassed even by the finest workmanship on Athenian buildings".

Import

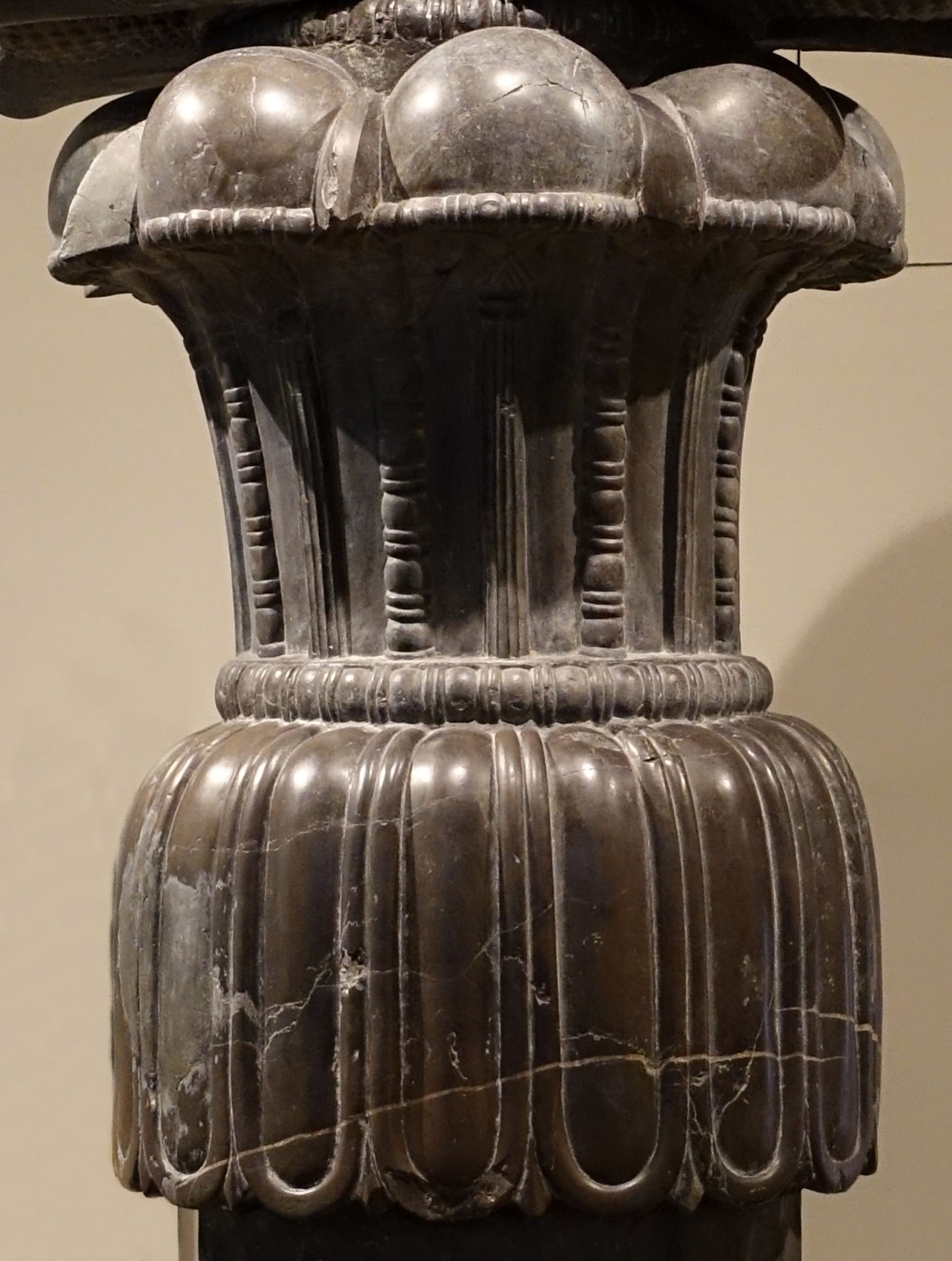
Monumental Achaemenid polish, 5th century BCE.

This large-scale polishing technique, seems to have been derived from polishing techniques in Achaemenid statuary, the stone-working techniques having spread in India after the destruction of the empire by Alexander the Great in 330 BC and the displacement of Persian and Perso-Greek artists and technicians. This know-how seems to have disappeared again after the Maurya period, as none of the later caves such as Ajanta have this characteristic of polished surfaces.

The very act of digging artificial caves in the rock, of which the Barabar Caves represent the oldest case in India, was probably inspired by the rock caves of the Achaemenids, as is the case in Naqsh-e Rostam. It seems, however, that in India there had been an ancient tradition of ascetics using caves.

Local development

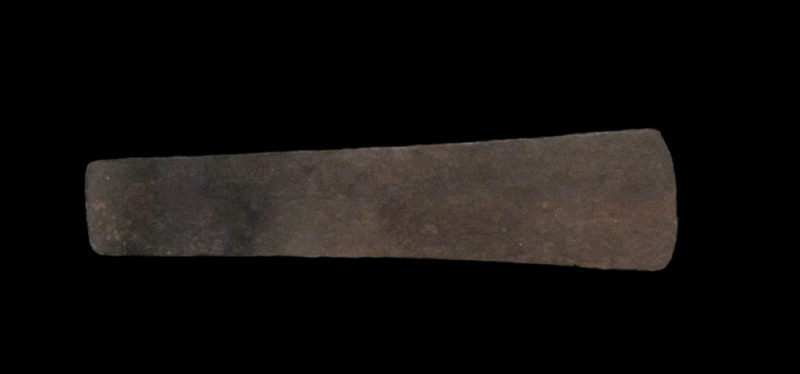
Polished stone ax, India, 2800-1500 BCE.

According to Gupta, the methods used in polishing the stone surfaces could have a local origin, citing the existence of various highly polished stone tools found in the area dating from much earlier times, in the Neolithic era. There is, however, no trace of evolution from these Neolithic objects to the polished stone architecture of many centuries later, and the Barabar caves are essentially a sudden technological break with no local history, suggesting the import of these techniques from another culture. Nor are there any known examples of stone architecture in India before the Maurya period. According to Gupta, the Son Bhandar Caves could be such an intermediate step, although relatively unique, and subject to questioning its chronology, since it is generally dated to the 2nd-4th centuries of our era.

== Inscriptions by Ashoka (circa 250 BCE) ==
Visvakarma Cave, Ashoka inscription (c.258 BCE)
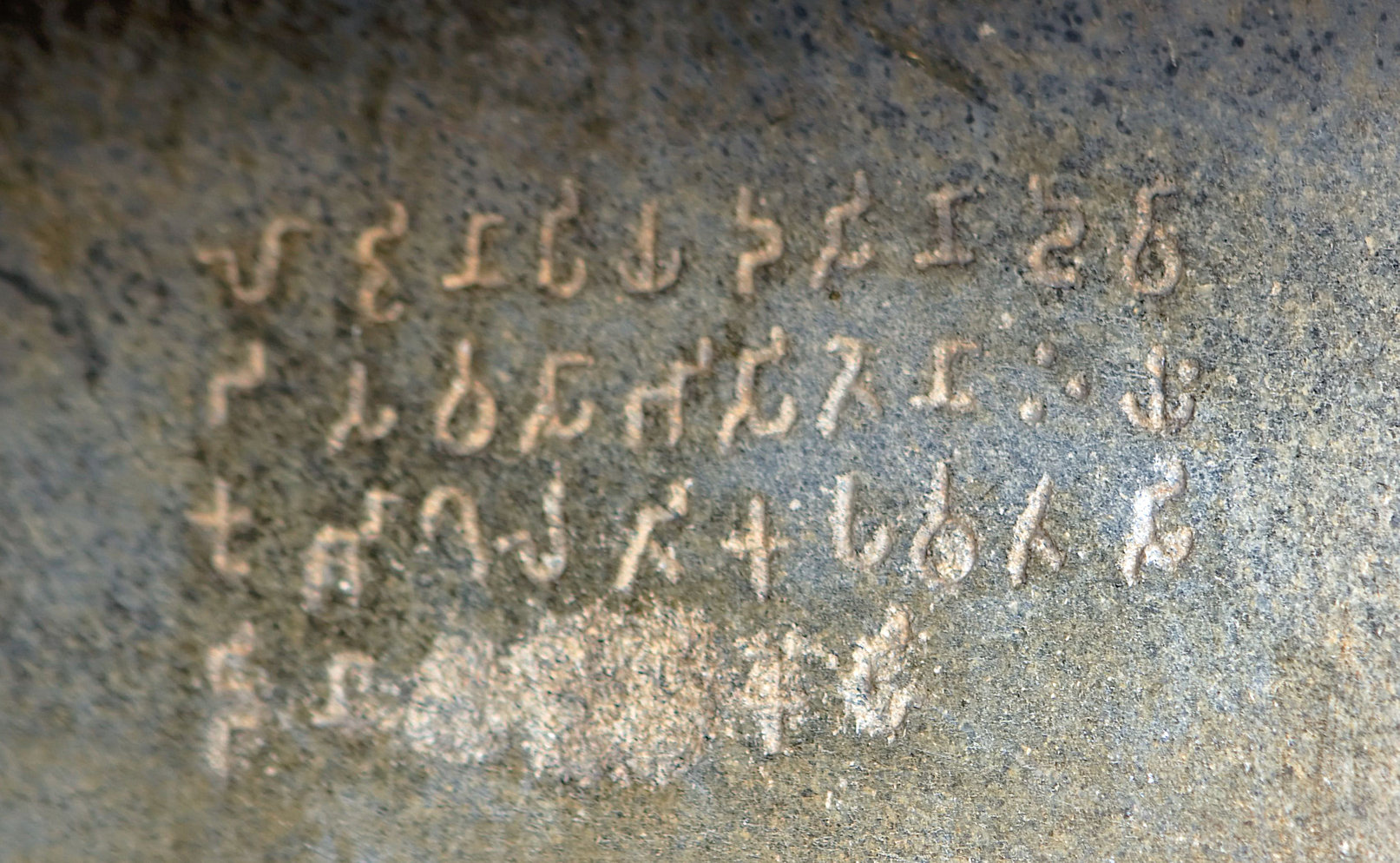
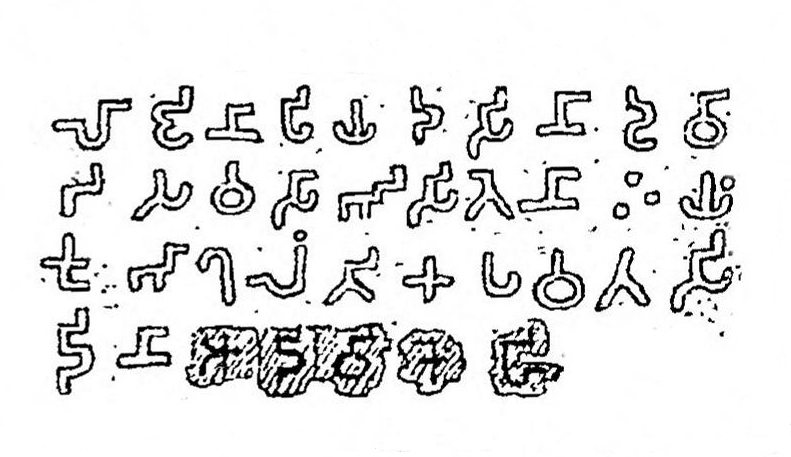
Dedicatory inscription of Ashoka in Visvakarma/Viswamitra Cave, Barabar. The word "Ajivikas" (𑀆𑀤𑀻𑀯𑀺𑀓𑁂𑀳𑀺, Ādīvikehi) at the end of the inscription was later attacked with the burin, at a time when the Brahmi script was still understood, i.e. before the 5th century, but is still readable. The Brahmi script inscription reads: "By King Priyadarsin, in the 12th year of his reign, this cave of Khalatika Mountain was offered to the Ajivikas."

The Ashoka inscriptions of the Barabar Caves were engraved during the 12th and 19th years of Ashoka's reign (about 258 BCE and 251 BCE respectively, based on a coronation date of 269 BCE), for the dedication of several caves to the sect of the Ajivikas, a sect of sramanas which flourished at the same time as Buddhism and Jainism. The words "Ajivikas" were later attacked with a chisel, probably by religious rivals, at a time when the Brahmi script was still understood (probably before the 5th century CE). However, the original inscriptions being deep, they remain easily decipherable.

The Ashoka inscriptions in the Barabar Caves are part of Ashoka's "Minor Rock Edicts", and appear in the three caves named Sudama, Visvakarma and Karna Chopar. Lomas Rishi, meanwhile, has no Ashoka inscription (only an inscription of Anantavarman above the entrance, 5-6th century CE), perhaps because she was never completed due to structural rock slide problems.

=== Ashoka and the construction of the caves ===
In addition to the inscriptions made in the 12th year of Ashoka's reign (250 BC), it is generally considered that the construction of the Barabar Caves itself also dates from his reign. The fact that the cave of Vivaskarma was not consecrated by Ashoka until the 19th year of his reign (ca. 257-258 BCE) argues for the hypothesis of a gradual construction of the caves under Ashoka. Similarly, the consecration of the caves on Nagarjuni Hill by Ashoka's successor Dasaratha, suggests that those caves were built after the reign of Ashoka.

== Inscriptions by Dasaratha Maurya (circa 230 BCE) ==
Dasaratha Maurya, Ashoka's grandson and regnal successor, wrote dedicatory inscriptions in the three other caves, forming the Nagarjuni group (Gopika, Vadathi and Vapiya caves) of the Barabar hills. It is generally considered that their construction dates from his reign.

The three caves were offered to the Ajivikas upon the accession to the throne of Dasaratha, confirming that these were still active around 230 BCE, and that Buddhism was not the exclusive religion of the Mauryas at that time.

The three caves are also characterized by an extremely advanced finish of the granite walls inside, which again confirms that the technique of "Mauryan polish" did not die out with the reign of Ashoka.

Inscriptions of Dasaratha (grandson of Ashoka)
English translation	Prakrit in Brahmi script (original text of the Nagarjuni Caves)
Inscription of Gopika cave: The cave of Gopika, a refuge that will last as long as the sun and the moon, was dug by Devanampiya (beloved of the gods) Dasaratha at from his elevation to the throne, to make it a hermitage for the most pious Ajivikas. Inscription of Vapiyaka Cave: Vapiyaka Cave, a refuge that will last as long as the sun and the moon, was dug by Devanampiya (beloved of the gods) Dasaratha during his elevation to the throne, to make it a hermitage for the most pious Ajivikas. Inscription of Vadathika Cave: Vadathi Cave, a refuge that will last as long as the sun and the moon, was dug by Devanampiya (beloved of the gods) Dasaratha during his elevation to the throne, to make it a hermitage for the most pious Ajivikas.	

== Hindu inscriptions of the 5-6th century CE ==
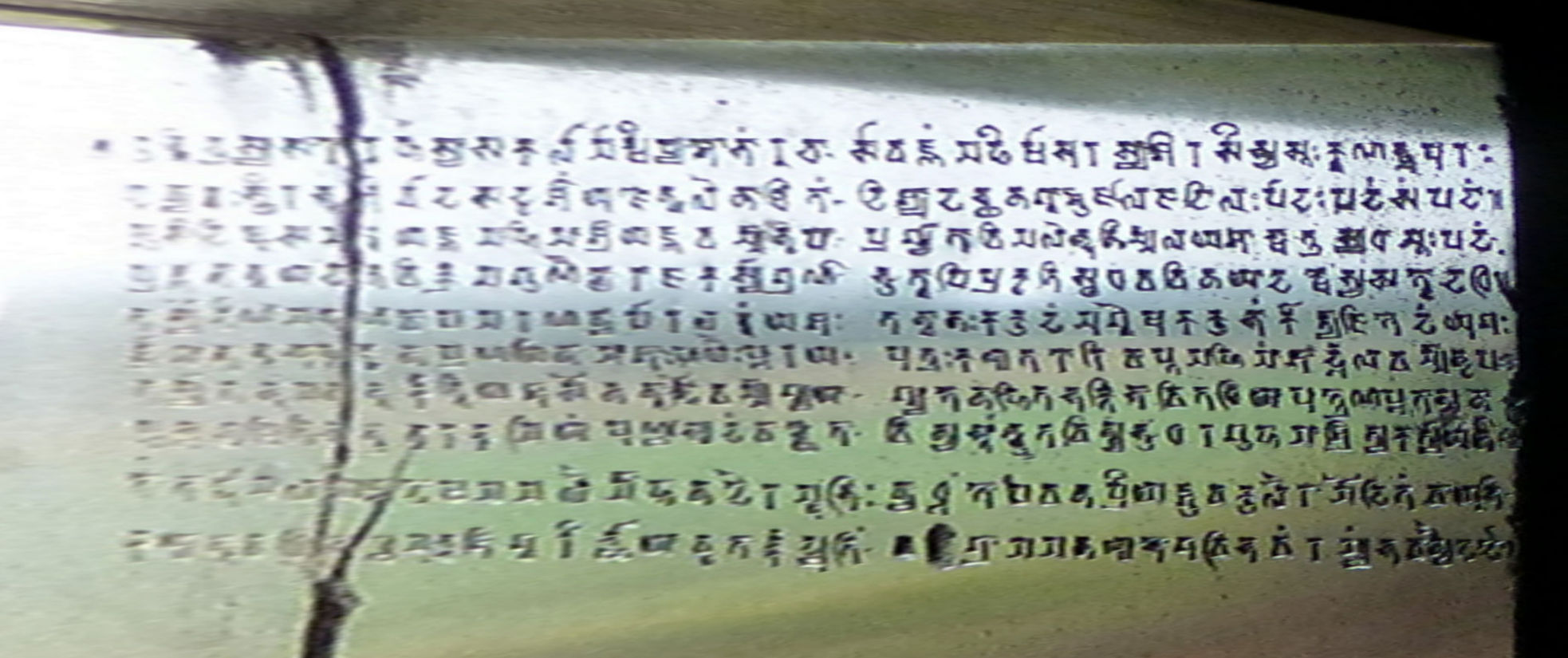
Gopika Cave Inscription of king Anantavarman, 5-6th century CE, in the entrance of the cave of Gopika, built by the grandson of Ashoka around 230 BCE.

Several Hindu inscriptions of the Maukhari king Anantavarman of the 5-6th century CE also appear in the caves of the Nagarjuni group, in the same caves where the dedicatory inscriptions of the grandson of Ashoka, Dasaratha, are also located: the Gopika Cave Inscription and the Vadathika Cave Inscription, as well as an inscription of Anantavarman above the cave entrance of Lomas Rishi. There are also a number of short inscriptions from the time of the Gupta Empire, generally inscribed in the entrance halls, and distributed in almost all the caves. Only the cave of Vivaskarma has received no inscriptions subsequent to his dedicatory inscription of Ashoka.

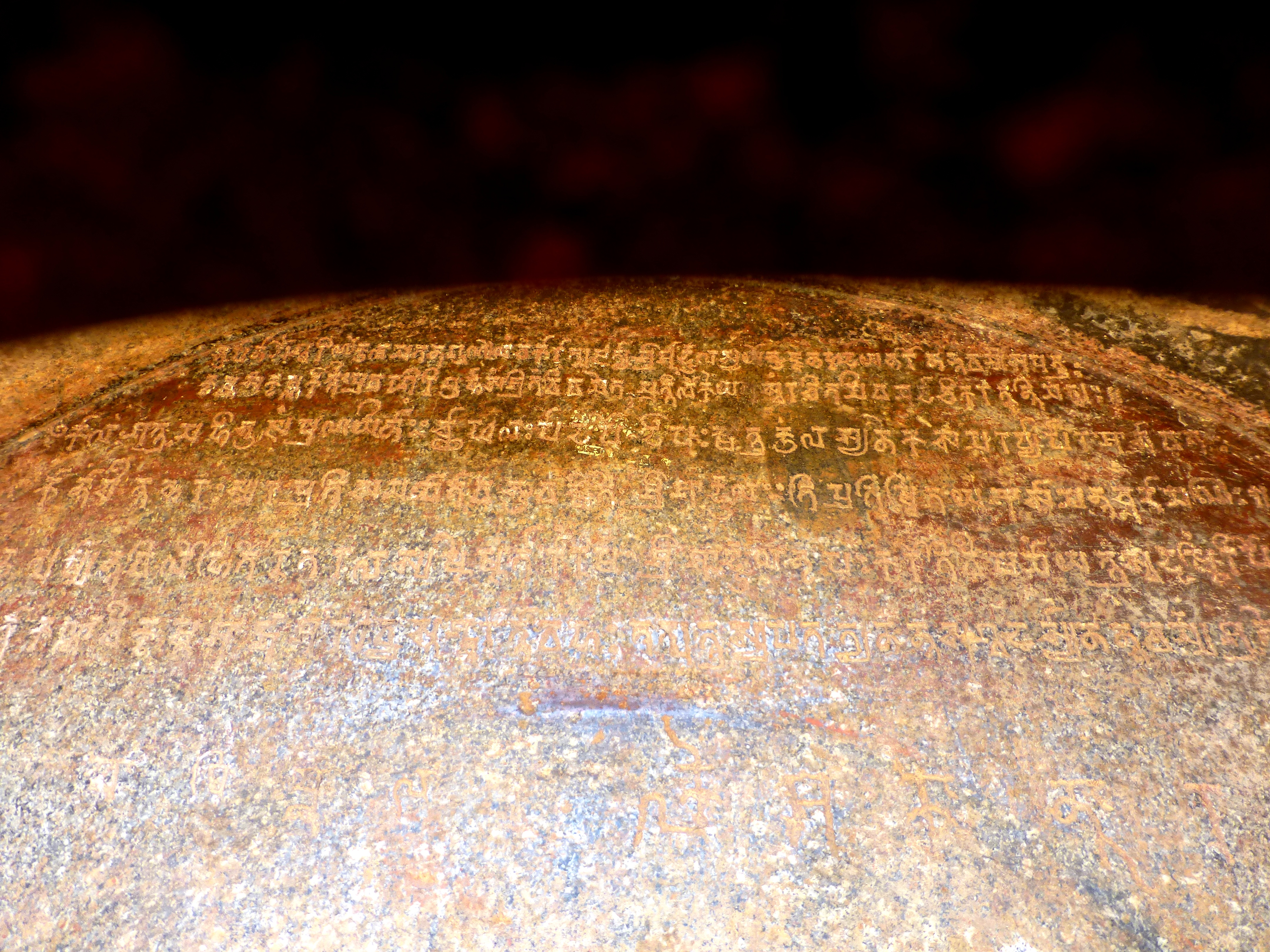
Inscription of Anantavarman above the entrance of Lomas Rishi.

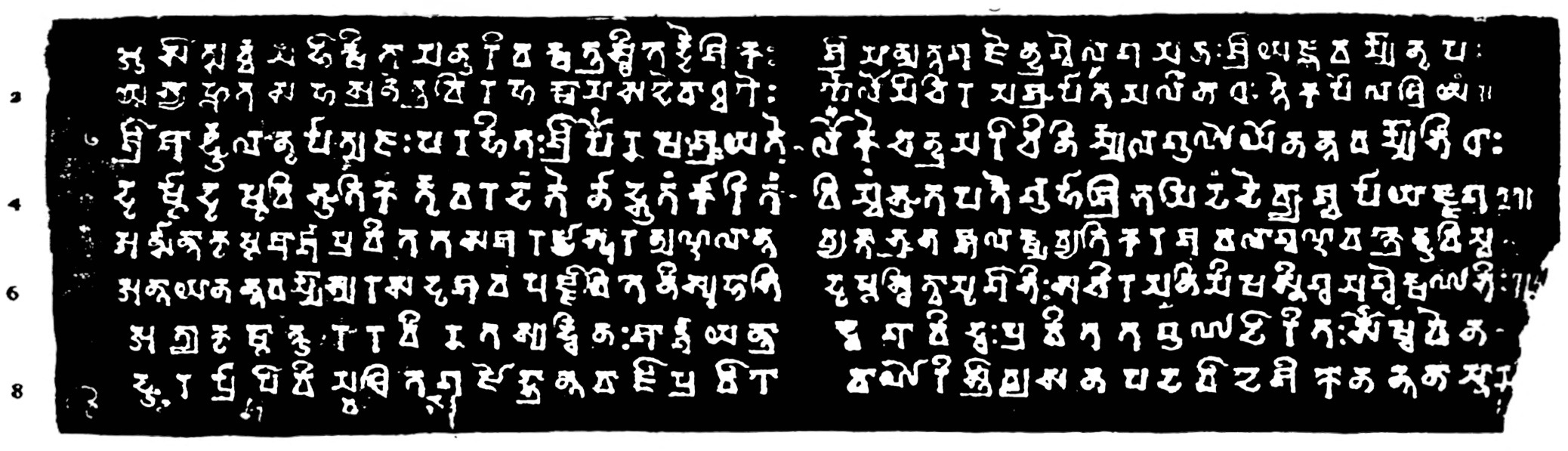
Inscription of Anantavarman in the cave of Vadathika.

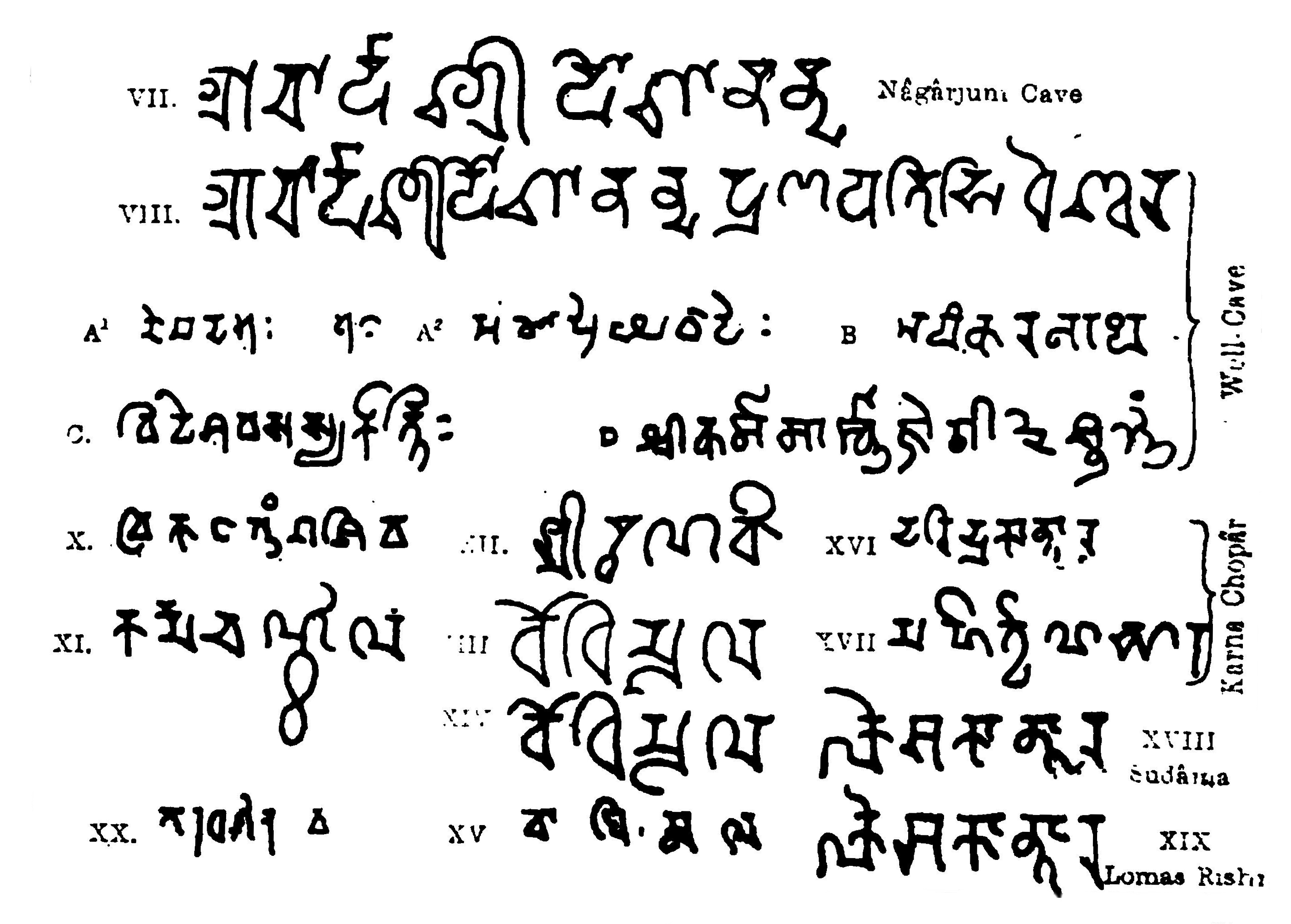
Short inscriptions from the era of the Gupta Empire, spread in almost all the caves.

Inscription of Anantavarman (Lomas Rishi cave)
Translation in English	Original in Sanskrit (original text of Lomas Rishi Cave)
Om! He, Anantavarman, who was the excellent son, captivating the heart of mankind, of the illustrious Sardaula, and who, possessed of very great virtues, adorned by his own (high) birth in the family of Maukhari kings, - him, of unsullied fame, with joy caused to be made, as if it were his own fame represented in bodily form in the world, this beautiful image, placed in (this) cave of the mountain Pravaragiri, of the (god) Krishna. (Line 3.) - The illustrious Sardula, of firmly established fame, the best among chieftains, became the ruler of the earth, he who was a very death to hostile kings; who was a tree the fruits of which were the (fulfilled) wishes of his favourites; who was the torch of the family of the warrior caste, which is glorious through waging many battles; (and) who, charming the thoughts of lovely women, resembled (the god) Smara. (L. 5.) - On whatsoever enemy the illustrious king Sardula casts in anger his scowling eye, the expanded and tremulous and clear and beloved pupil of which is red at the comers between the uplifted brows,— on him there falls the death-dealing arrow, discharged from the bowstring drawn up to (his) ear, of his son, the giver of endless pleasure, who has the name of Anantavarman. Corpus Inscriptionum Indicarum, Fleet p.223	

== Related caves ==
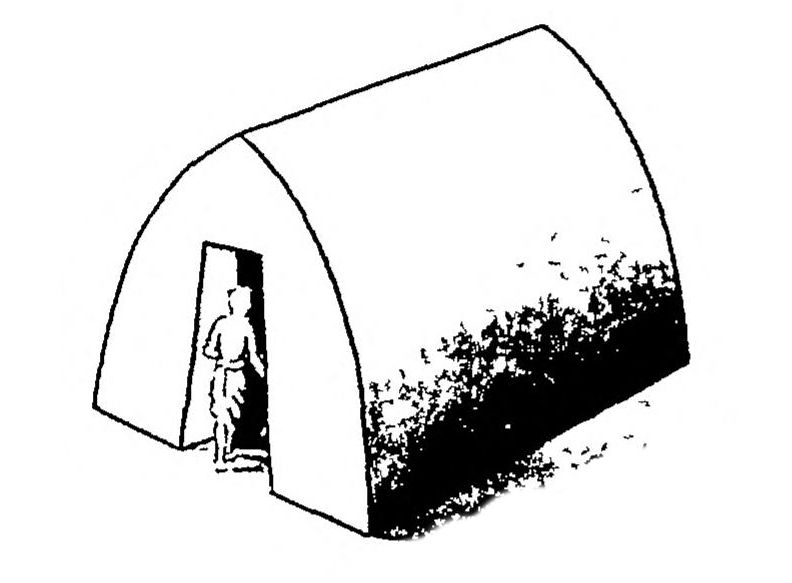
Sitamarhi Cave.

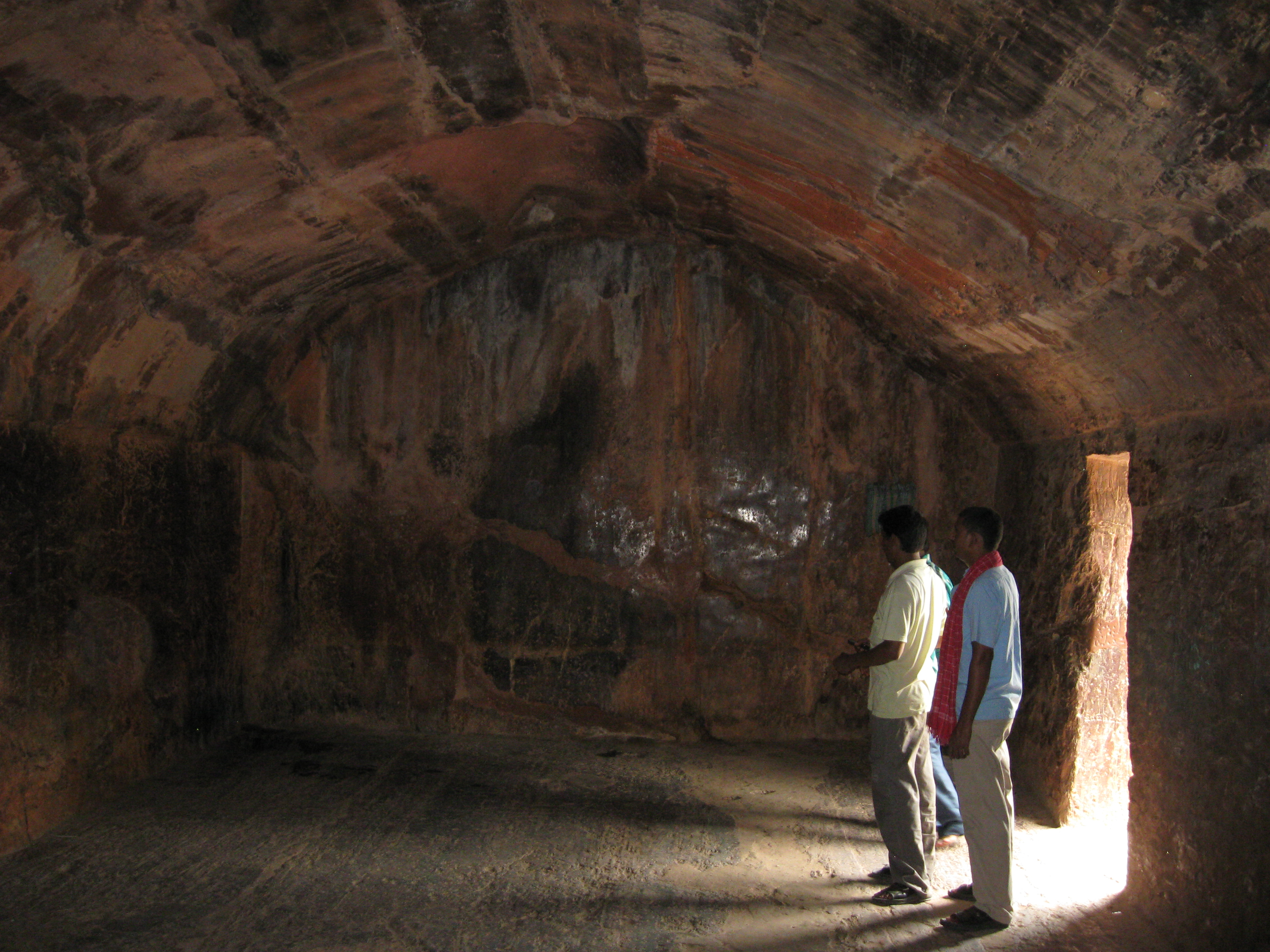
Son Bhandar Caves.

There is another cave with the structure and polishing qualities of the Barabar Caves, but without any inscription. This is the Sitamarhi Cave, 20 km from Rajgir, 10 km south-west of Hisua, also dated of the Maurya empire. It is smaller than the Barabar caves, measuring only 4.91x3.43m, with a ceiling height of 2.01m. The entrance is also trapezoidal, as for the Barabar Caves.

Finally, the Jain Son Bhandar Caves in Rajgir, generally dated to the 2nd-4th centuries CE, nevertheless share a broad structure reminiscent of the caves of Barabar and some small areas of irregular polish, which leads some authors to suggest that they may actually be contemporary to, and even earlier than, the Barabar Caves, and would conveniently create a precedent and an evolutionary step to the Barabar Caves.

== Access by means of transportation ==
The monument is accessible by the Barabar hill road which connects to the Barabar-Panari-Diha Road which is further connected to NH-83 Patna-Gaya Road (west) and SH-4 (east), via the Belaganj Barabar Road.

There are no direct public transport connections, as the nearest bus and/or railway stations are located more than 15 km away in Jehanabad, Gaya and Makhdumpur. Furthermore, Gaya Airport is located to the south and Jay Prakash Narayan International Airport in Patna (80 km away).

== Hindu statuary ==
Outside the caves on the top of the hill, about 600 meters away (25.011524°N 85.062553°E), are located the Hindu temple of Vanavar Shiv Mandir and many examples of small Hindu statuary.

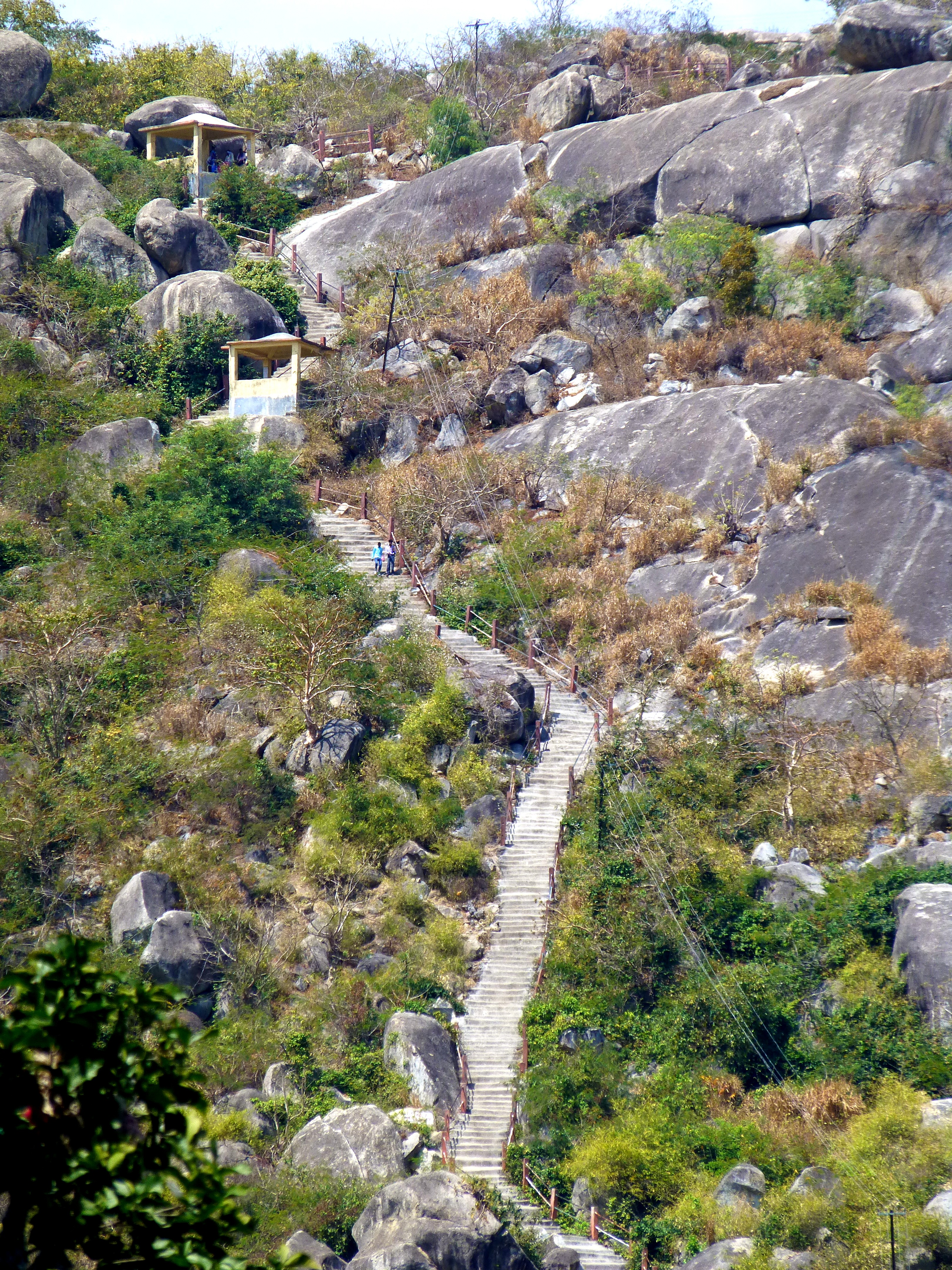
Path leading to the Hindu Temple.

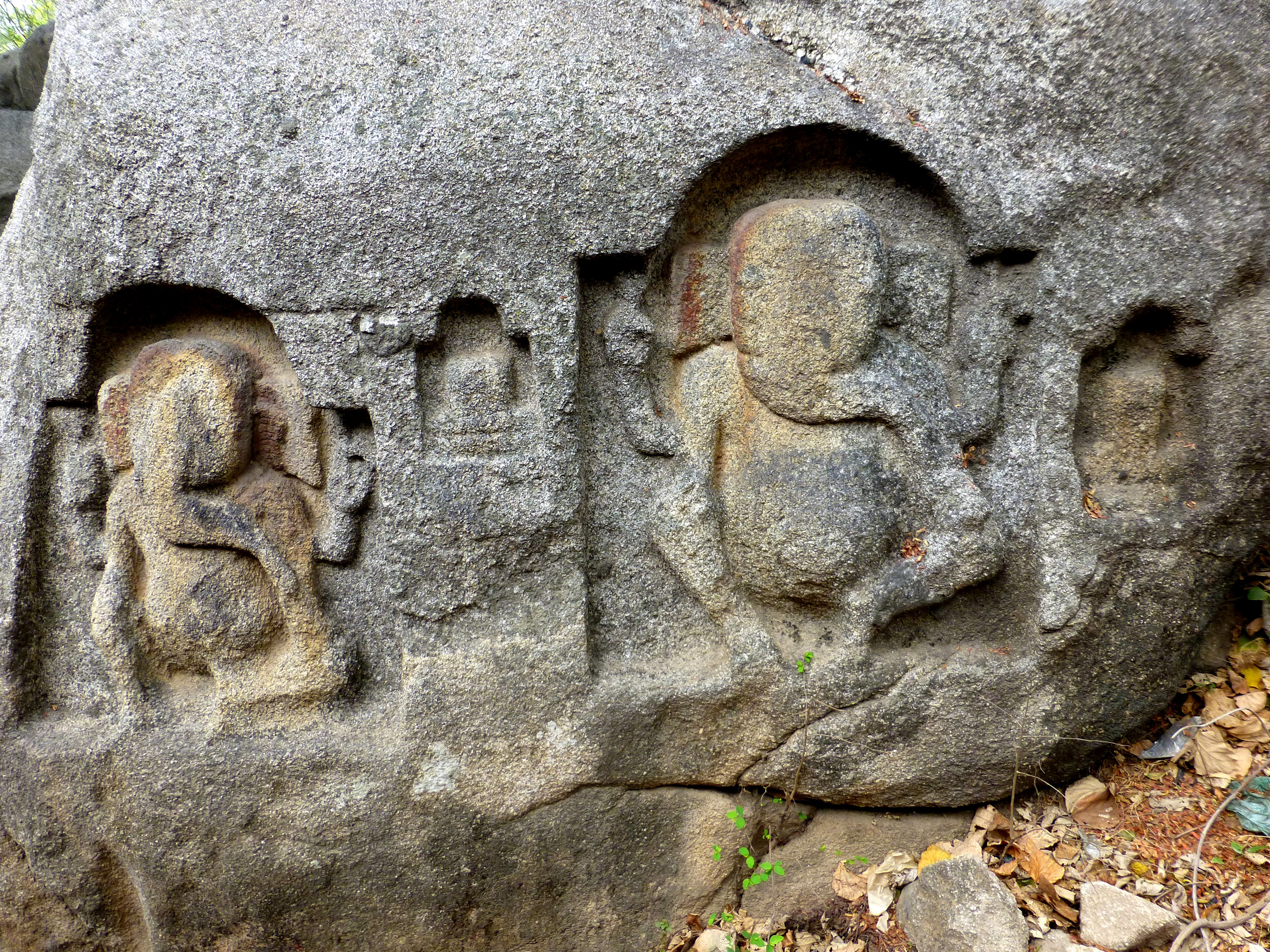
Statues of Ganesh.

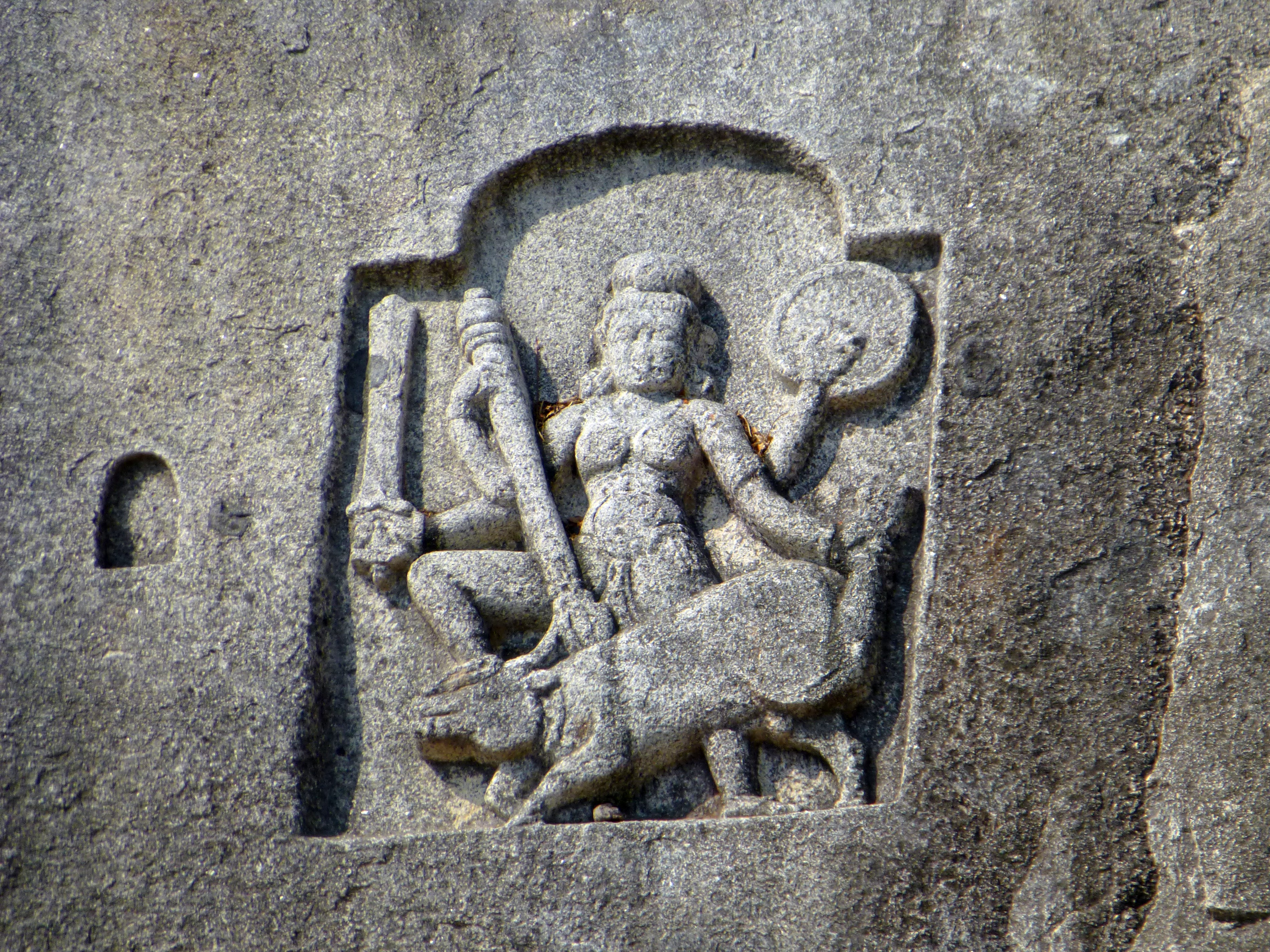
Statue of Durga.

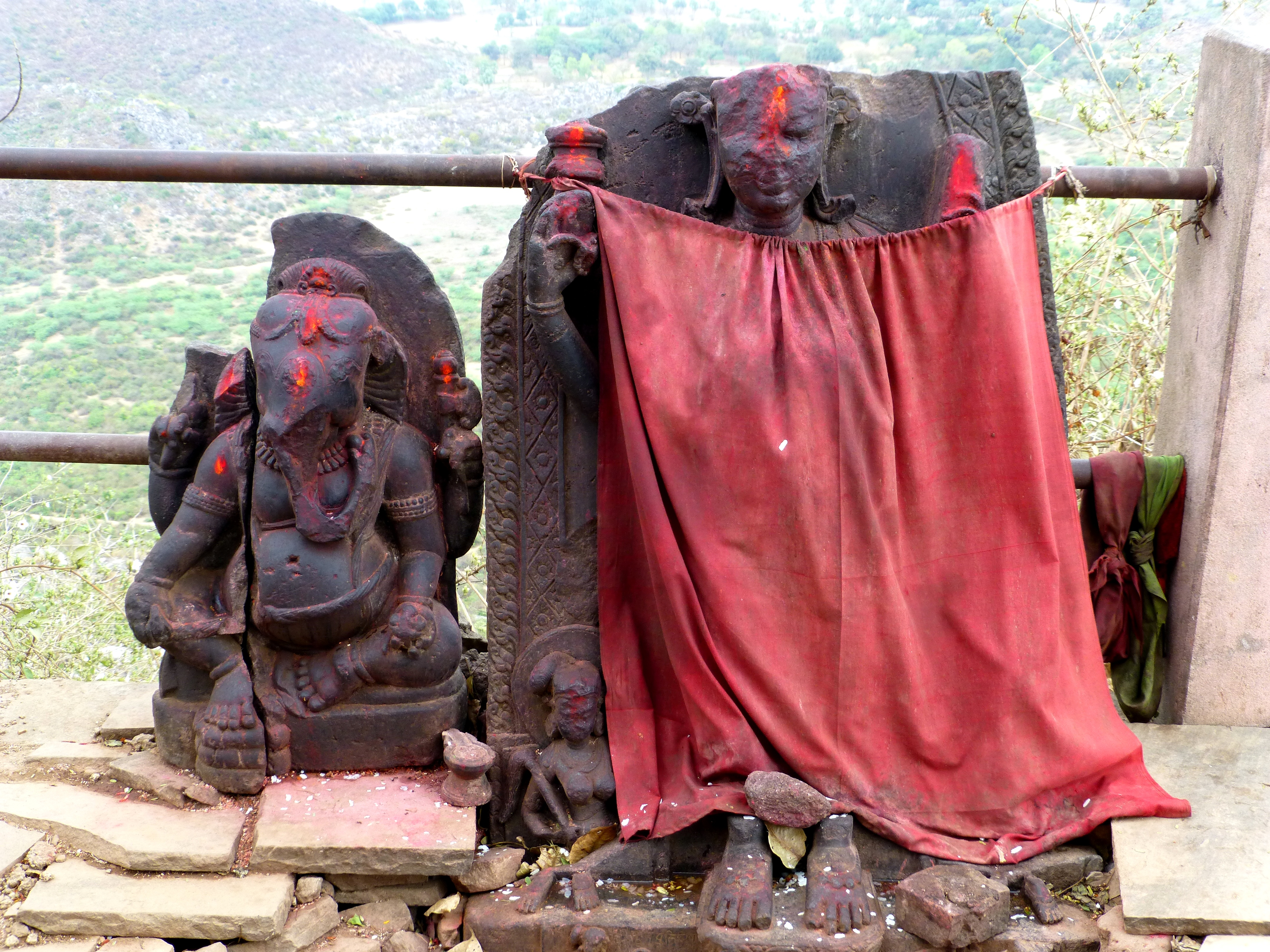
Fragments of statues.

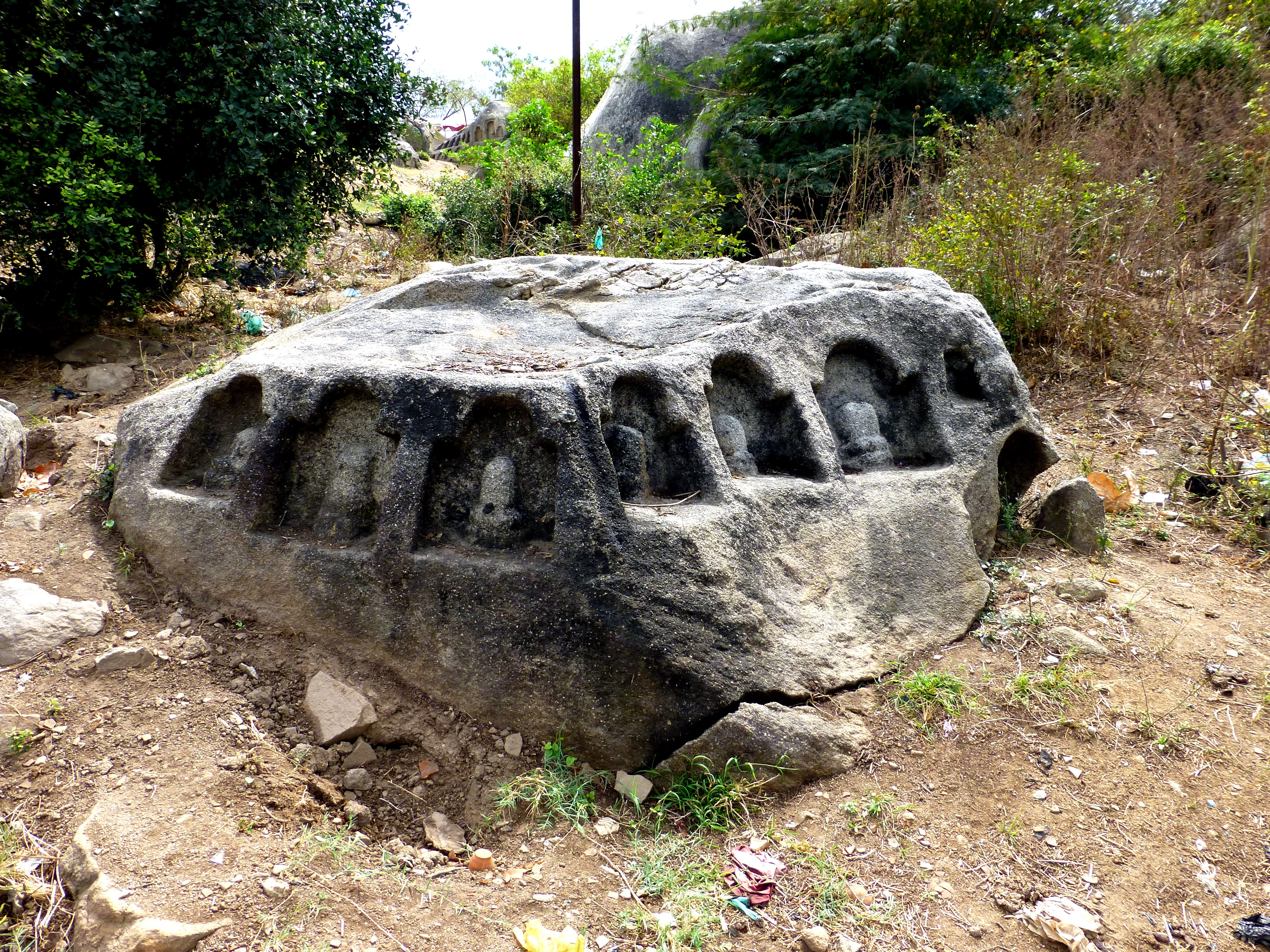
Linga carved in the rock.

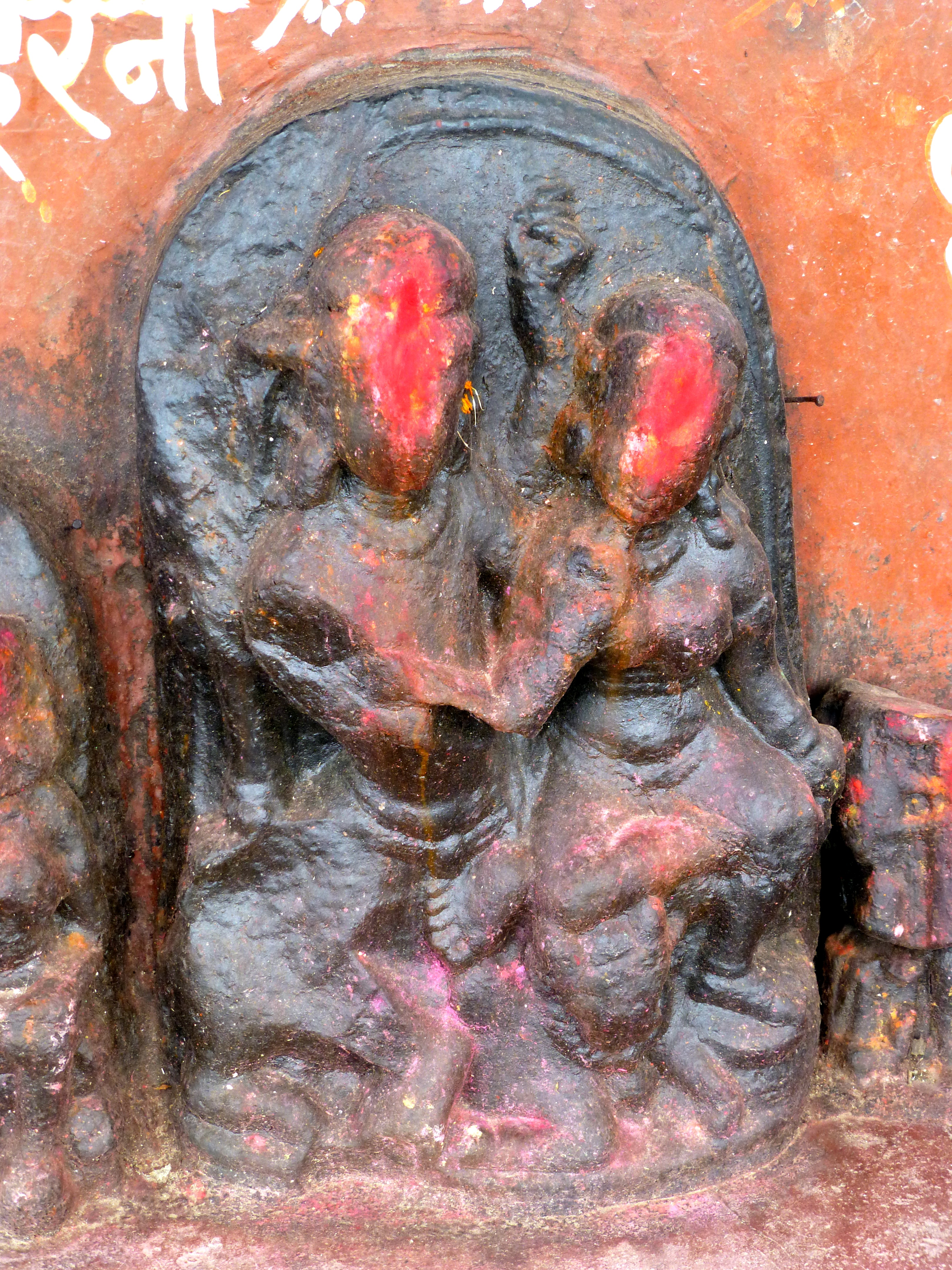
Temple statue.

== See also ==
- Kumhrar
- Edicts of Ashoka
- List of colossal sculptures in situ
