= Indian rock-cut architecture =

Creation of structures by excavating solid rock

Indian rock-cut architecture

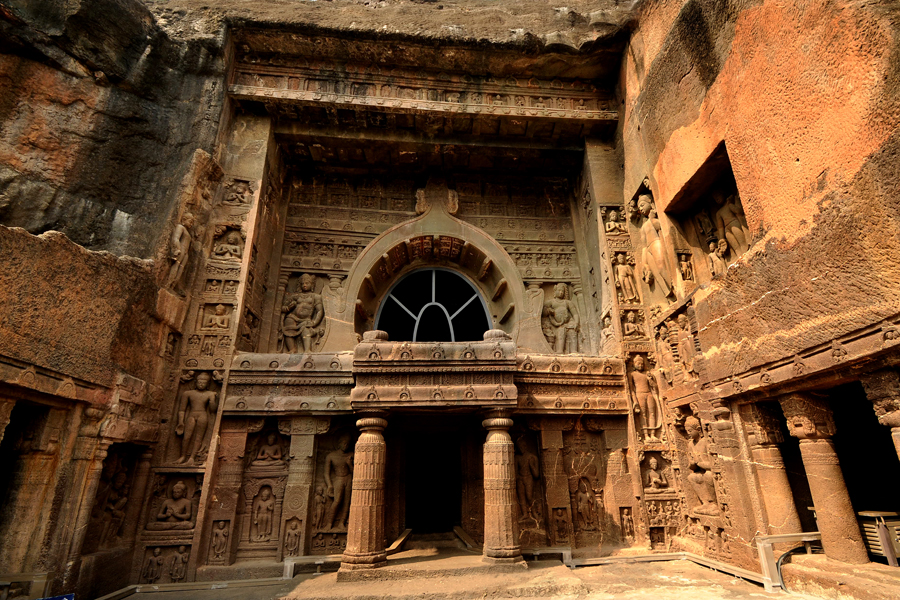
Cave 19, Ajanta, a 5th-century chaitya hall

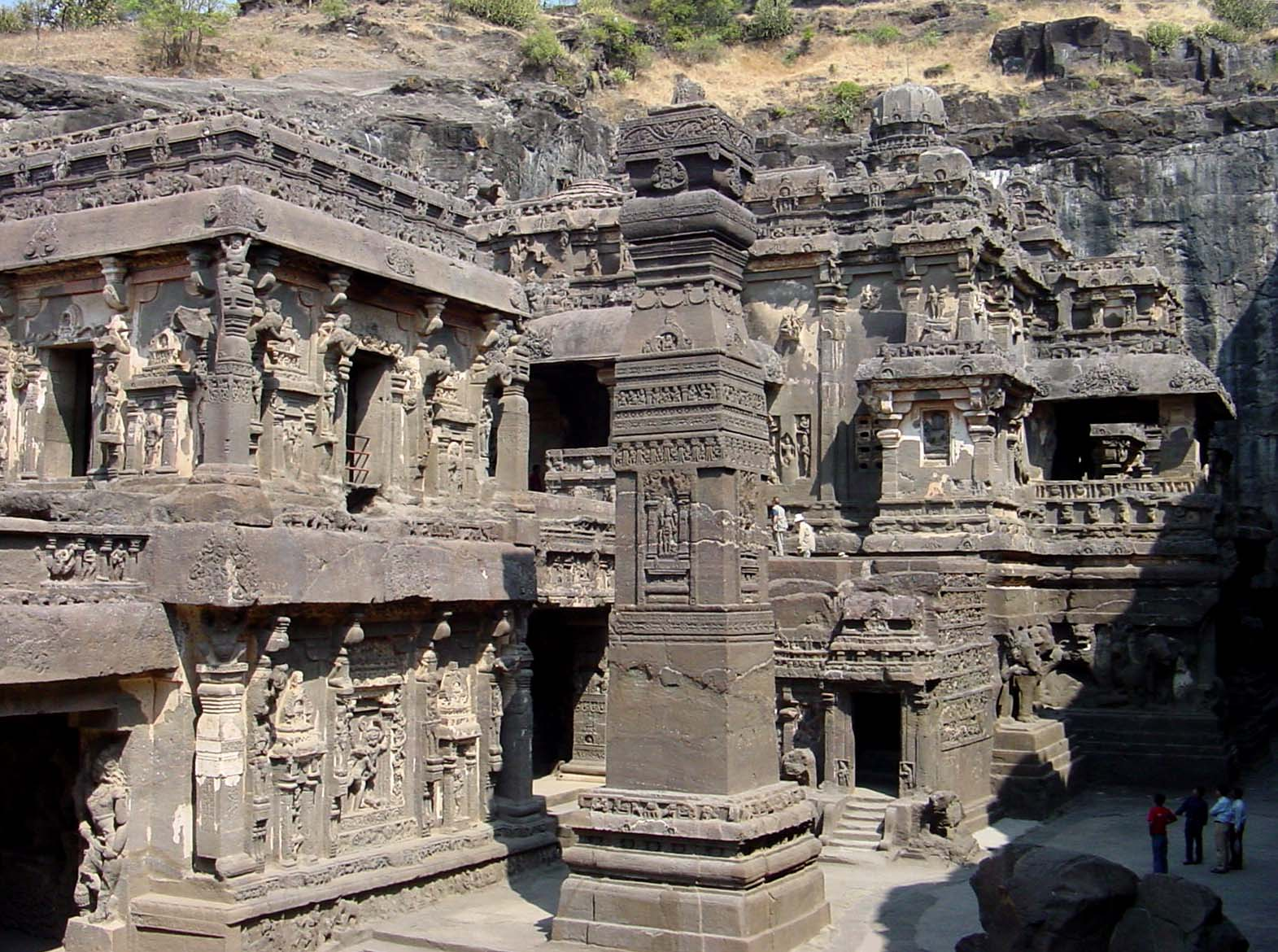
Kailash Temple, Ellora cave 16

Indian rock-cut architecture is more various and found in greater abundance in that country than any other form of rock-cut architecture around the world. Rock-cut architecture is the practice of creating a structure by carving it out of solid natural rock. Rock that is not part of the structure is removed until the only rock left makes up the architectural elements of the excavated interior. Indian rock-cut architecture is mostly religious in nature.

There are more than 1,500 known rock-cut structures in India. Many of these structures contain artwork of global importance, and most are adorned with exquisite stone carvings. These ancient and medieval structures represent significant achievements of structural engineering and craftsmanship. The effort expended often astonishes visitors, but seen from one aspect, a rock-cut structure is a decorated rock quarry; most of the stone removed was typically put to economic use elsewhere.

In India, caves have long been regarded as sacred places. Caves that were enlarged or entirely man-made were believed to be as sacred as natural caves. The sanctuary in all Indian religious structures, even free-standing ones, was designed to have the same cave-like feeling, as it is generally small and dark, without natural light. The oldest rock-cut architecture is found in the Barabar caves, Bihar, which were built around the 3rd century BC. Other early cave temples are found in the western Deccan; these are mostly Buddhist shrines and monasteries, dating between 100 BC and 170 AD. Originally, there were probably wooden structures associated with them, which would have deteriorated over time.

Historically, artisans carried forward design elements from wood in their rock-cut temples: skilled craftsmen carved rock to imitate timber texture, grain, and structure. The earliest cave temples include the Bhaja Caves, the Karla Caves, the Bedse Caves, the Kanheri Caves, and some of the Ajanta Caves. Relics found in these caves suggest a connection between the religious and the commercial. Buddhist missionaries are known to have accompanied traders on the busy international trading routes through India. Some of the more sumptuous cave temples, commissioned by wealthy traders, included pillars, arches, and elaborate facades. They were made during the period when maritime trade boomed between the Roman Empire and south-east Asia.

Although free-standing structural temples were being built by the 5th century, rock-cut cave temples continued to be built in parallel. Later rock-cut cave architecture became more sophisticated, as in the Ellora Caves. The monolithic Kailash Temple is considered to be the peak of this type construction. Although cave temples continued to be built until the 12th century, rock-cut architecture became almost totally structural in nature. That is, rocks were cut into bricks and used to build free-standing structures. Kailash was the last spectacular rock-cut excavated temple. Numerous rock reliefs, relief sculptures carved into rock faces, have been found outside caves or at other sites. New discoveries of relatively small rock-cut sites, mostly Buddhist, continue to be made in the 21st century, especially in the Deccan.

== Early natural caves ==
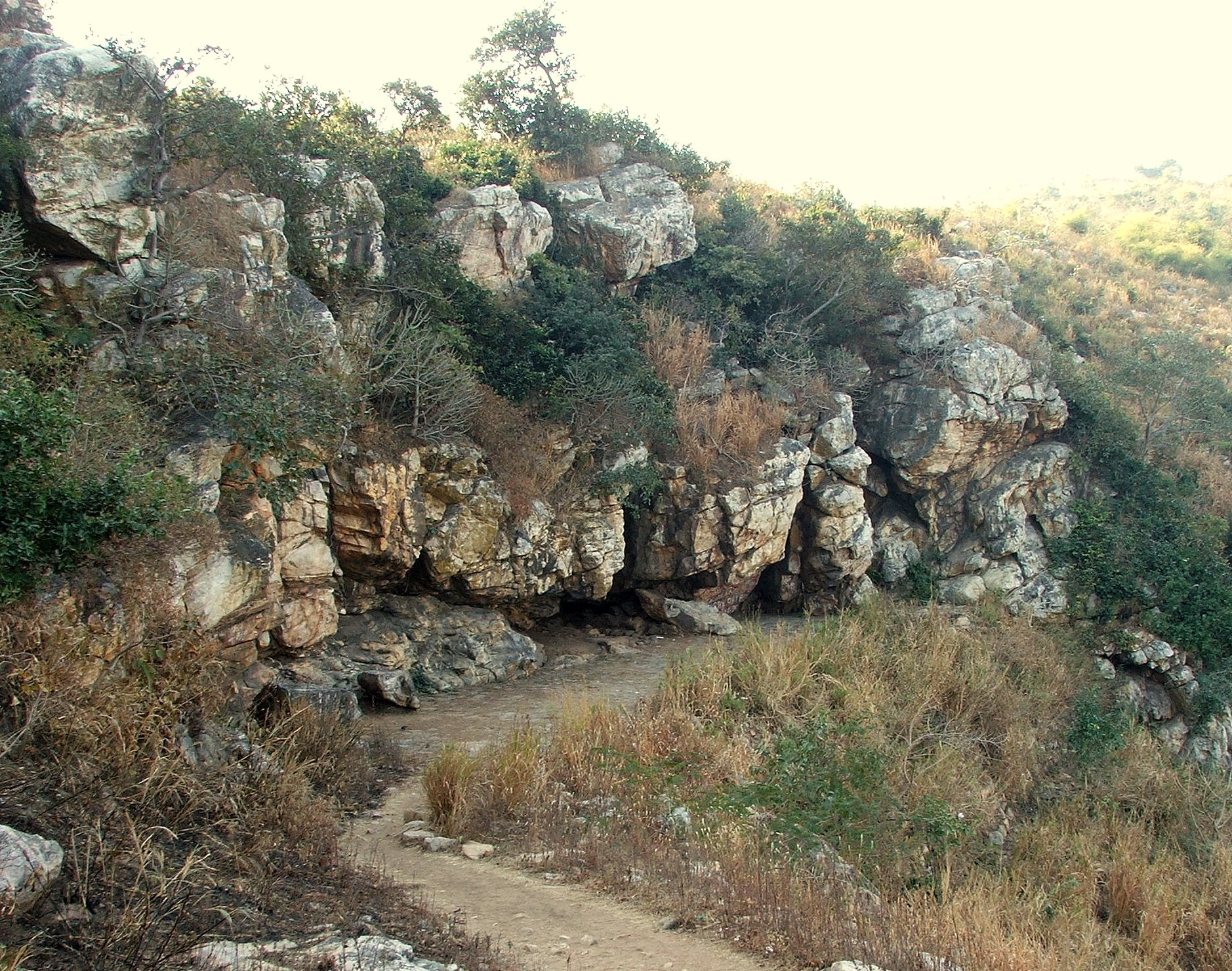
Saptaparni Cave, a retreat of the Buddha.

The earliest caves used by humans were natural caves that they occupied or used for a variety of purposes, such as shrines and shelters. Evidence suggests that the caves were first occupied and slightly altered during the Palaeolithic and Mesolithic periods, up to about 6000 BC. These changes are not classified as architecture. Early examples included decorating overhanging rock with rock-cut designs. The Rock Shelters of Bhimbetka, now designated as a UNESCO World Heritage Site, are located on the edge of the Deccan Plateau, where dramatic erosion has left massive sandstone outcrops. Researchers have found primitive tools and decorative rock paintings made by humans in the area's many caves and grottos, the earliest paintings dating to circa 8,000 BC.

During the time of the Buddha (c. 563/480 or c. 483/400 BC), Buddhist monks were also in the habit of using natural caves, such as the Saptaparni Cave, southwest from Rajgir, Bihar. Many believe it to be the site in which Buddha spent some time before his death, and where the first Buddhist council was held after the Buddha died (paranirvana). The Buddha himself had also used the Indrasala Cave for meditation, starting a tradition of using caves, natural or man-made, as religious retreats, that would last for over a millennium.

== Artificial caves of Eastern India (3rd–2nd centuries BC) ==
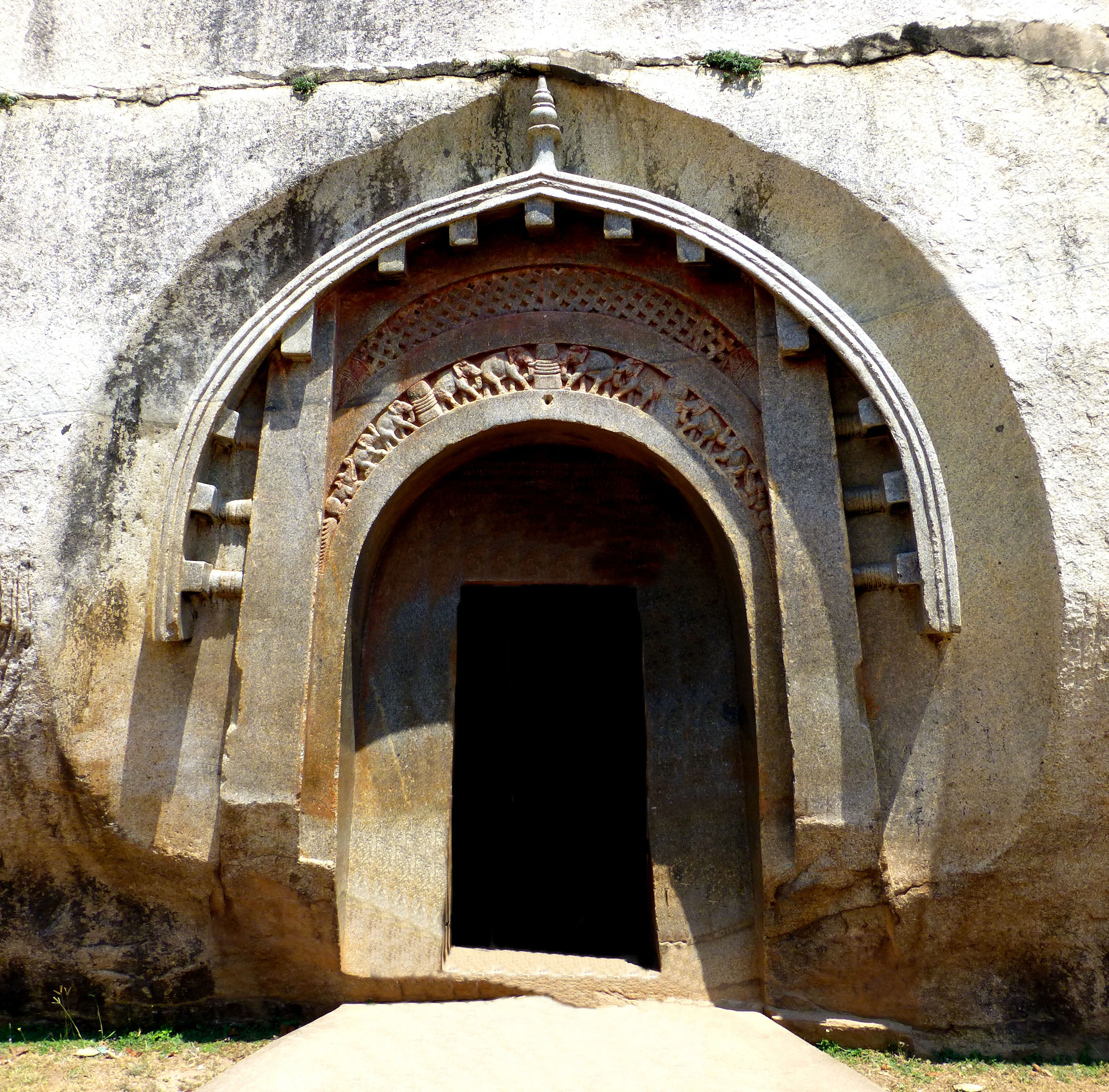
The famous carved door of Lomas Rishi, one of the Barabar Caves, dated to approximately 250 BC, displaying the first known Maurya reliefs.

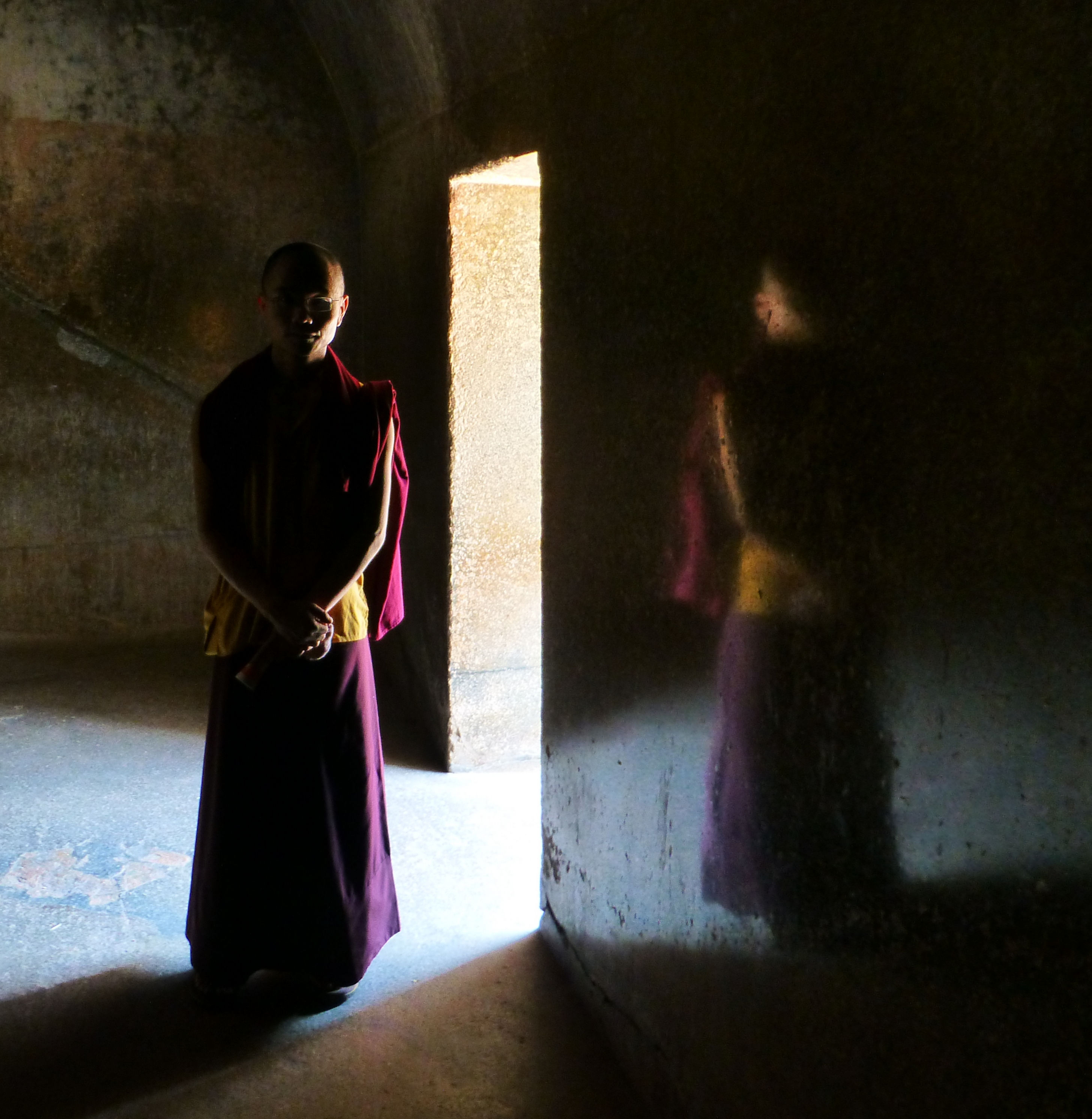
The quasi-perfect walls of the Barabar Caves were dug into the hard rock and polished to a mirror effect circa 250 BC, date of the inscriptions of Ashoka.

In the 3rd century BC Indian rock-cut architecture began to develop, starting with the already highly sophisticated and state-sponsored Barabar caves in Bihar, personally dedicated by Ashoka circa 250 BC. These artificial caves exhibit an amazing level of technical proficiency, the extremely hard granite rock being cut in geometrical fashion and polished to a mirror-like finish.

There is another cave with the structure and polishing qualities of the Barabar caves, but without any inscription. This is the Sitamarhi Cave, 20 km from Rajgir, 10 km south-west of Hisua, also dated of the Maurya empire. It is smaller than the Barabar caves, measuring only 4.91x3.43m, with a ceiling height of 2.01m. The entrance is also trapezoidal, as for the Barabar caves.

Finally, the Jain Son Bhandar Caves in Rajgir, generally dated to the 2nd–4th centuries CE, nevertheless share a broad structure reminiscent of the caves of Barabar and some small areas of irregular polish, which leads some authors to suggest that they may actually be contemporary to, and even earlier than, the Barabar caves, and would conveniently create a precedent and an evolutionary step to the Barabar Caves.

To the southeast of Bihar, the Udayagiri and Khandagiri Caves, partly natural and partly artificial caves were built near the city of Bhubaneswar in Odisha, India. The caves are situated on two adjacent hills, Udayagiri and Khandagiri, mentioned as Kumari Parvat in the Hathigumpha inscription. They have a number of finely and ornately carved caves built during 2nd century BC. It is believed that most of these caves were carved out as residential blocks for Jain monks during the reign of King Kharavela. Udayagiri means "Sunrise Hill" and has 18 caves while Khandagiri has 15 caves.

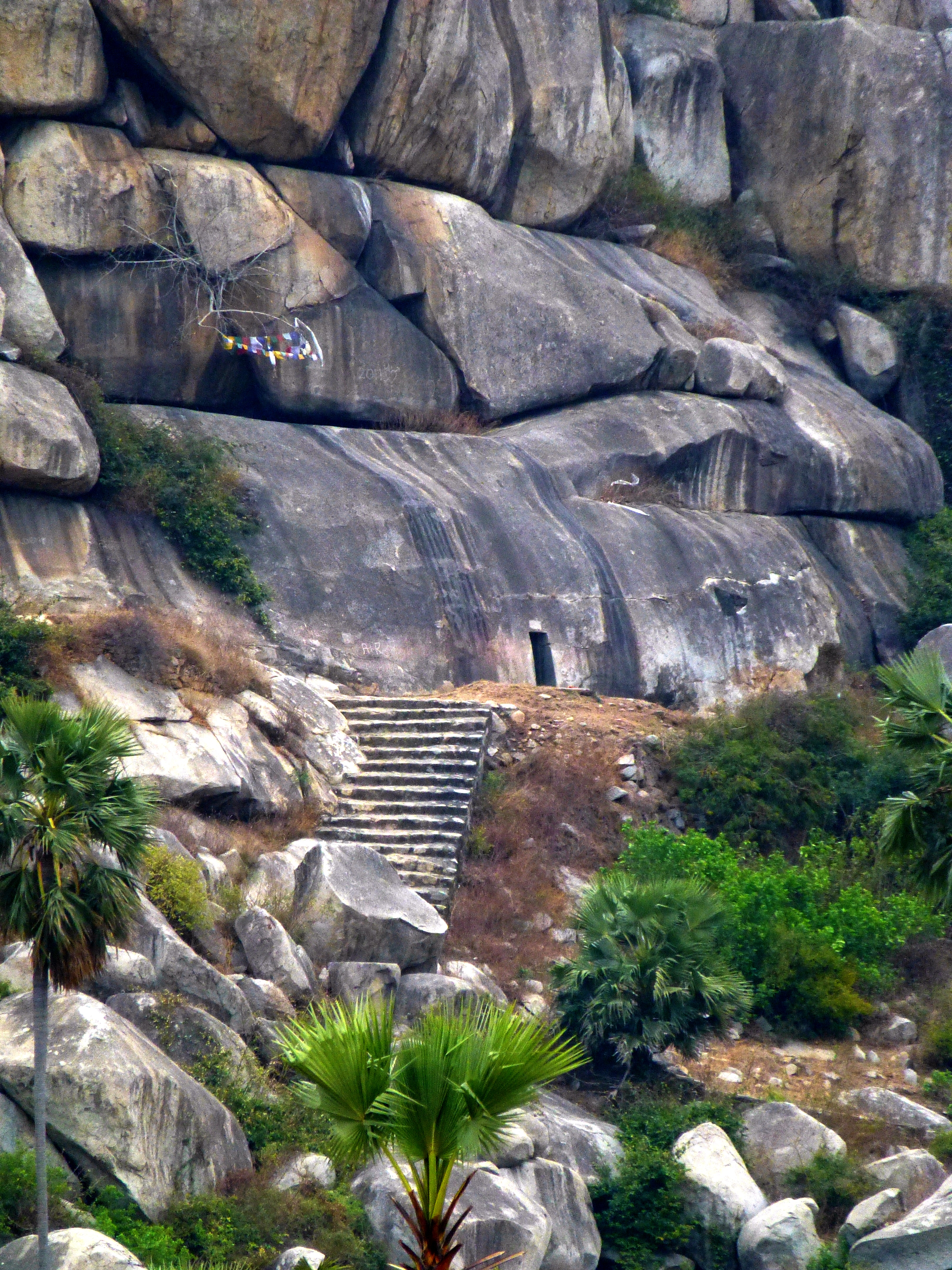
Entrance of the Gopika cave, Barabar Caves, 3rd century BC.

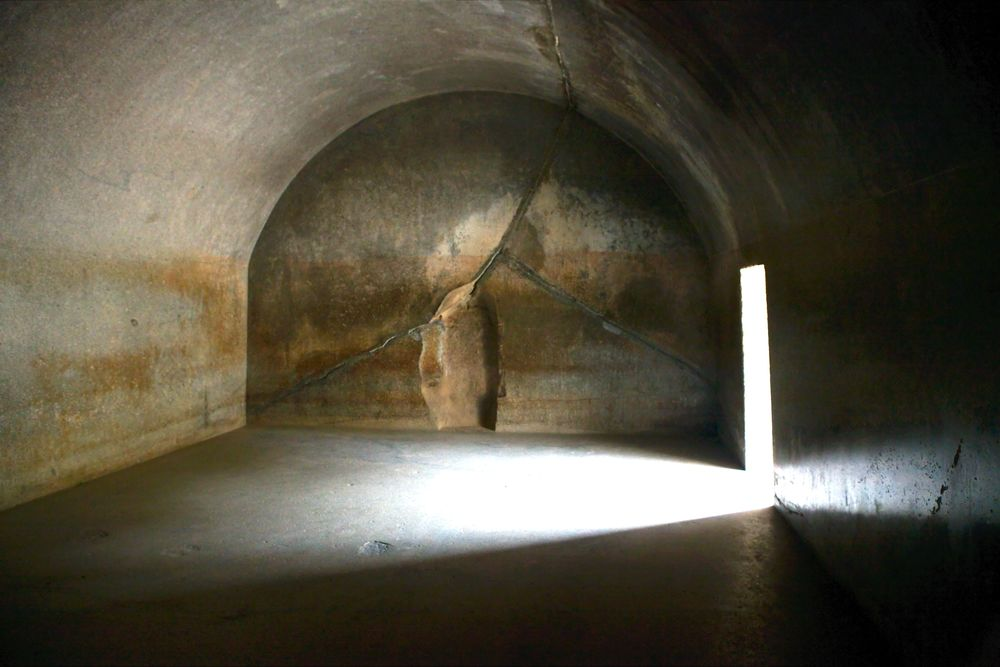
Polished interior of Sudama, in the Barabar Caves, 3rd century BC

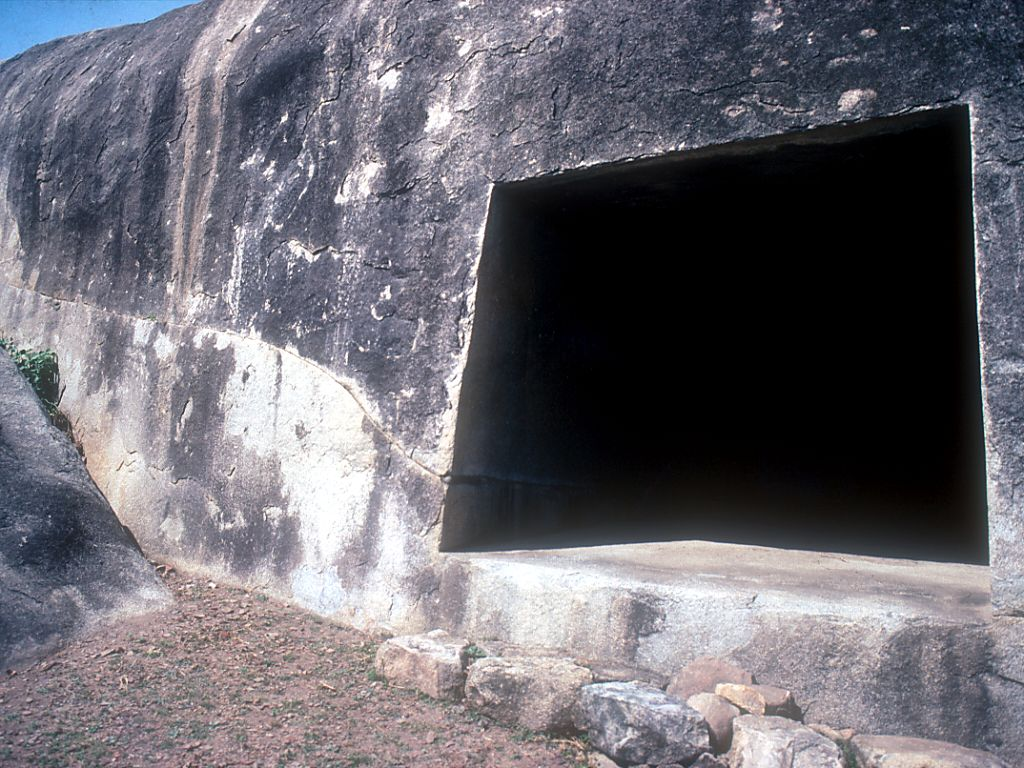
Visvakarma cave entrance, Barabar Caves, 3rd century BC

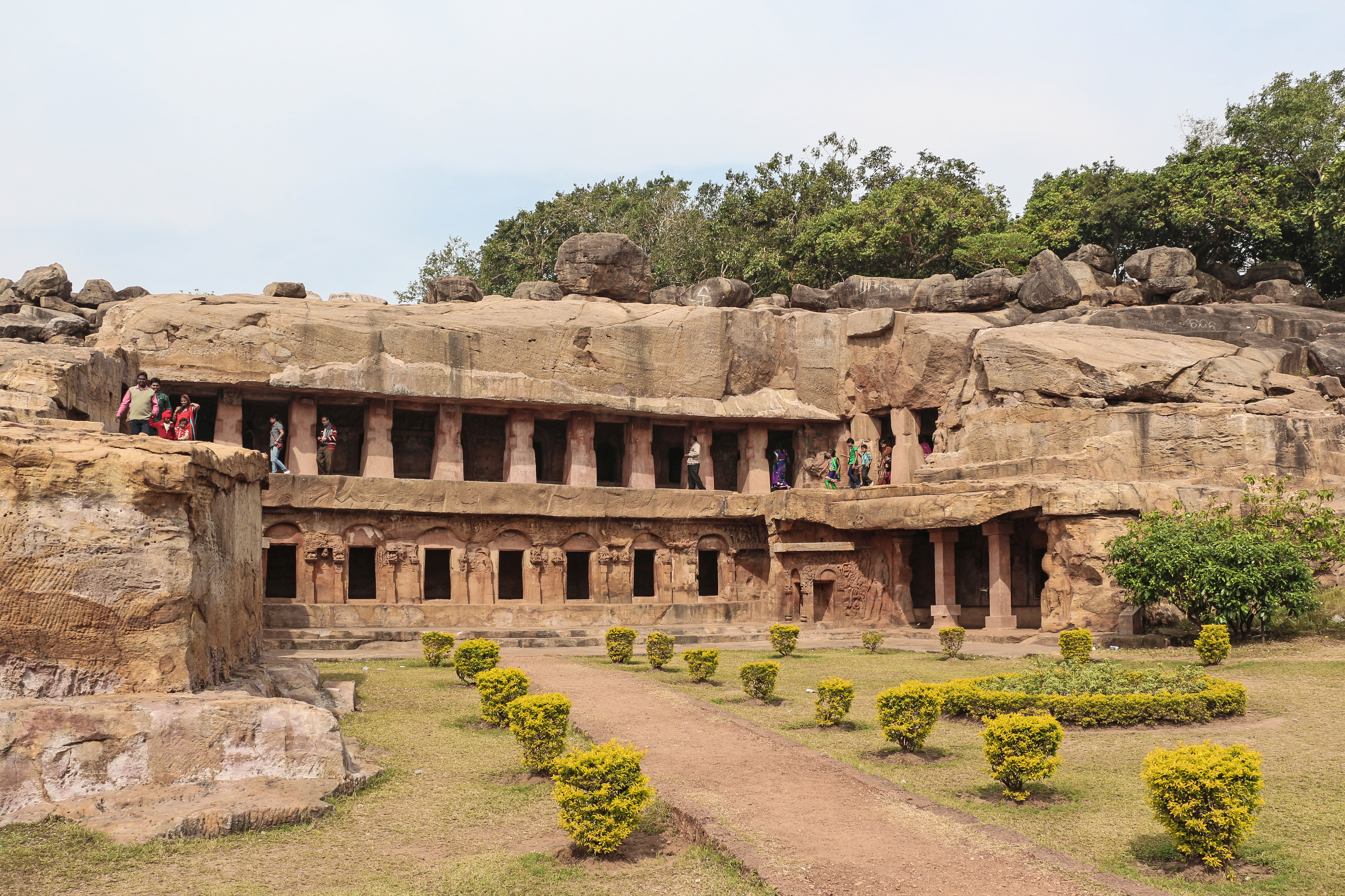
Udayagiri and Khandagiri Caves, 2nd century BC

== Artificial caves of Western India ==
After the Barabar Caves, huge efforts were made at building religious caves in Western India until the 6th century CE. However, the polishing of cave walls was abandoned, never to be revived. Such grandiose caves as Karla Caves (1st century CE) or the Ajanta Caves (5th century CE) do not have any polishing either. This may be due to the fact that Mauryan caves were dedicated and sponsored by the Mauryan Imperial government, allowing for huge resources and efforts to be spent, whereas later caves where essentially the result of donations by commoners, who could not afford as high a level of spending.

=== First wave of construction (2nd century BC–4th century AD) ===
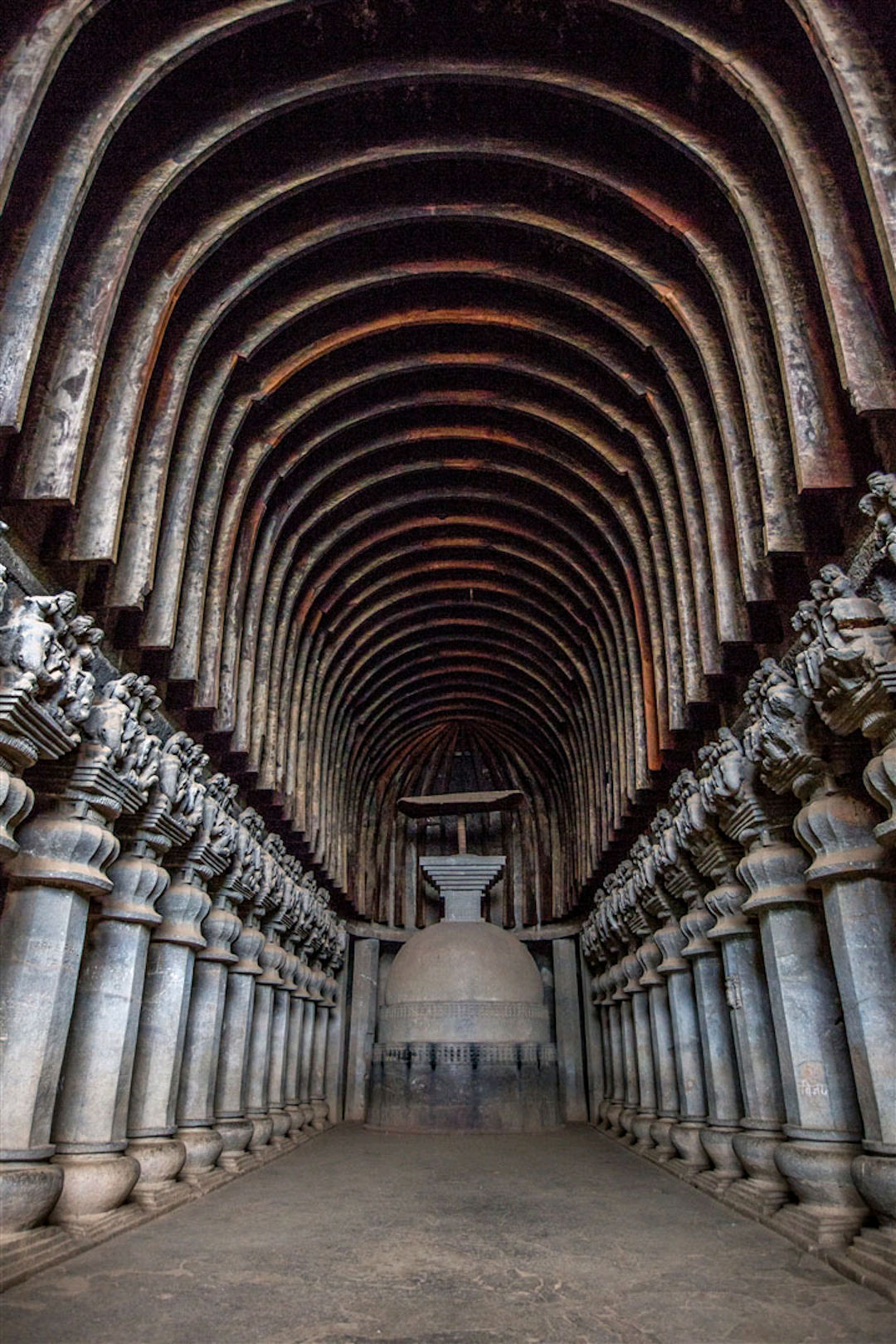
The Great Chaitya in the Karla Caves, Maharashtra, India, 1st-century BC

Probably owing to the fall in the 2nd century BC of the Mauryan Empire and the subsequent persecutions of Buddhism under Pushyamitra Sunga, it is thought that many Buddhists relocated to the Deccan under the protection of the Andhra dynasty, thus shifting the cave-building effort to western India: an enormous effort at creating religious caves (usually Buddhist or Jain) continued there until the 2nd century AD, culminating with the Karla Caves or the Pandavleni Caves. These caves generally followed an apsidal plan with a stupa in the back for the chaityas, and a rectangular plan with surrounding cells for the viharas.

When Buddhist missionaries arrived, they naturally gravitated to caves for use as temples and abodes, in accord with their religious ideas of asceticism and the monastic life. The Western Ghats topography, with its flat-topped basalt hills, deep ravines, and sharp cliffs, was suited to their cultural inclinations. The earliest of the Kanheri Caves were excavated in the 1st and 2nd centuries BC, as were those at Ajanta, which were occupied continuously by Buddhist monks from 200 BC to 650 AD. As the Buddhist ideology encouraged involvement in trade, monasteries often became stopovers for inland traders and provided lodging houses along trade routes. As mercantile and royal endowments grew, cave interiors became more elaborate, with interior walls decorated in paintings, reliefs, and intricate carvings. Numerous donors provided the funds for the building of these caves and left donatory inscriptions, including laity, members of the clergy, government officials, and even foreigners such as Yavanas (Greeks) representing about 8% of all inscriptions. Facades were added to the exteriors while the interiors became designated for specific uses, such as monasteries (viharas) and worship halls (chaityas). Over the centuries, simple caves began to resemble free-standing buildings, needing to be formally designed and requiring highly skilled artisans and craftsmen to complete. These artisans had not forgotten their timber roots and imitated the nuances of a wooden structure and the wood grain in working with stone.

Early examples of rock-cut architecture are the Buddhist and Jain cave basadi, temples and monasteries, many with gavakshas (chandrashalas). The ascetic nature of these religions inclined their followers to live in natural caves and grottos in the hillsides, away from the cities, and these became enhanced and embellished over time. Although many temples, monasteries, and stupas had been destroyed, by contrast, cave temples are very well preserved as they are both less visible and therefore less vulnerable to vandalism as well as made of more durable material than wood and masonry. There are around 1200 cave temples still in existence, most of which are Buddhist. The residences of monks were called Viharas and the cave shrines, called Chaityas, were for congregational worship. The earliest rock-cut garbhagriha, similar to free-standing ones later, had an inner circular chamber with pillars to create a circumambulatory path (pradakshina) around the stupa and an outer rectangular hall for the congregation of the devotees.

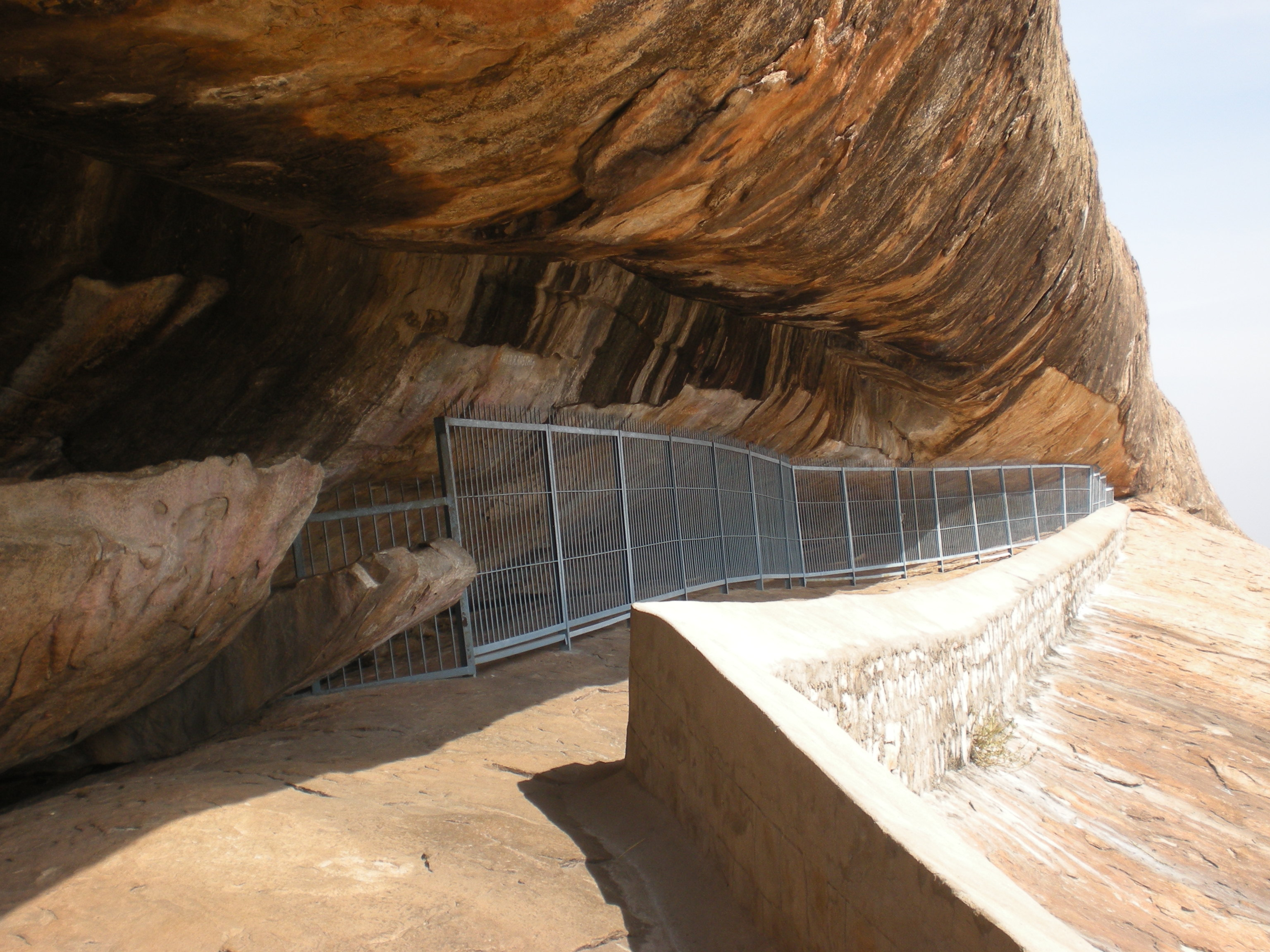
Ezhadippattam, Sittanavasal Cave, 1st century BC

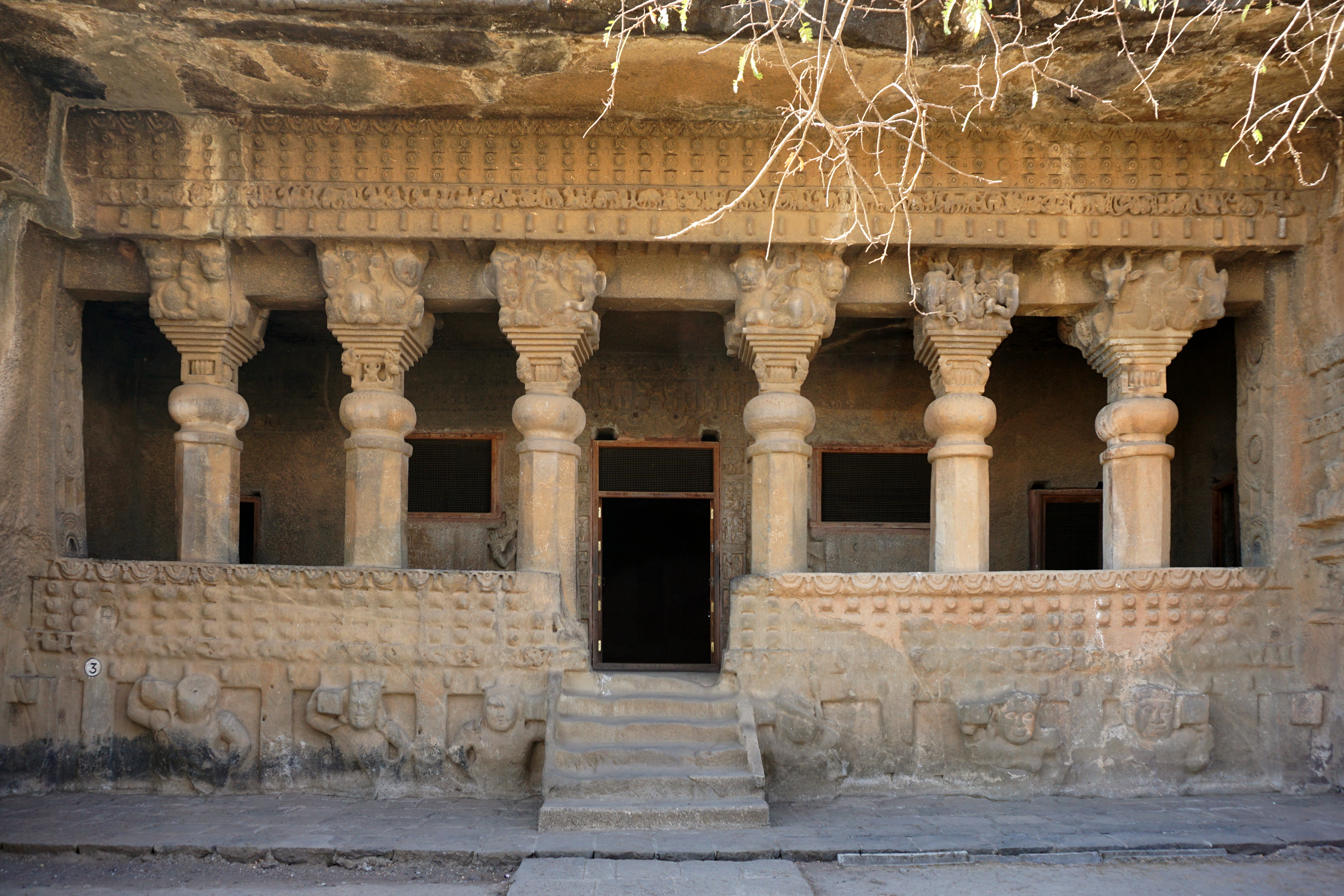
Gautamiputra vihara at Pandavleni Caves built in the 2nd century AD by the Satavahana dynasty.

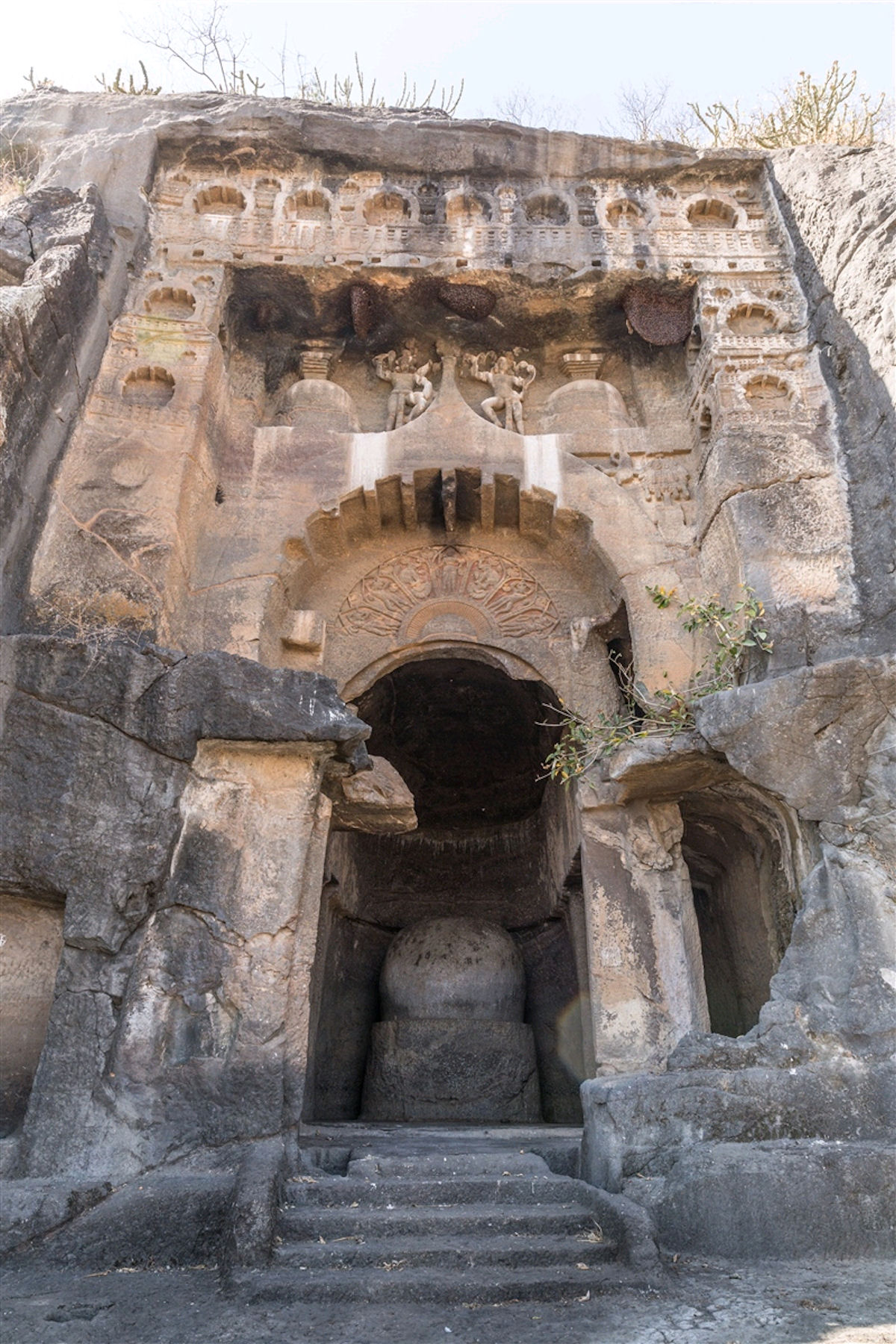
Manmodi Caves in Junnar, 2nd century BC

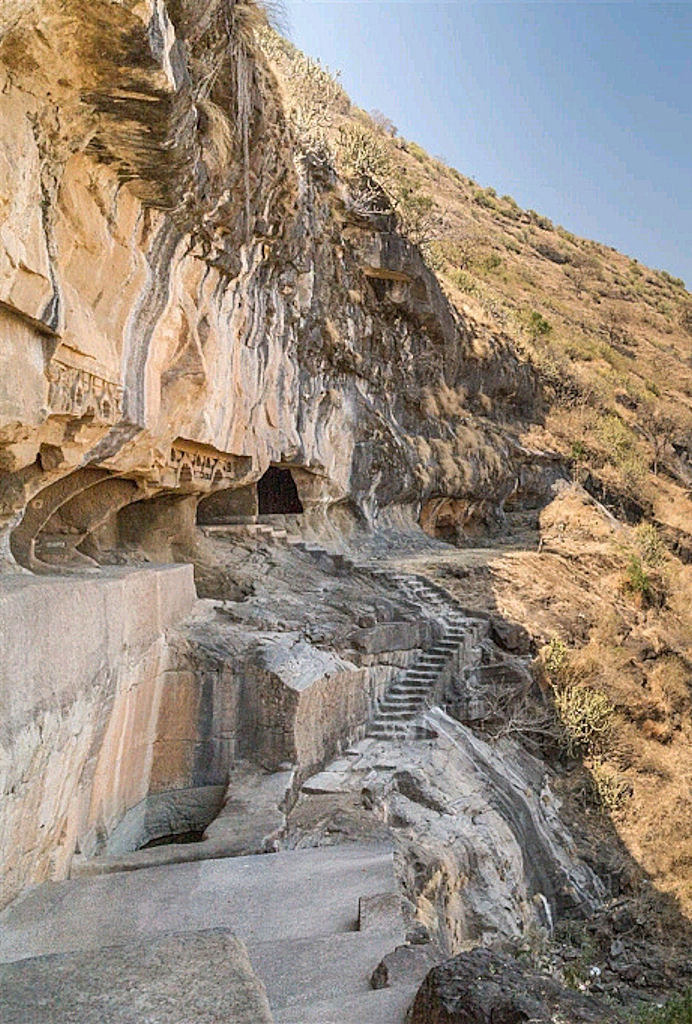
Tulja Caves in Junnar

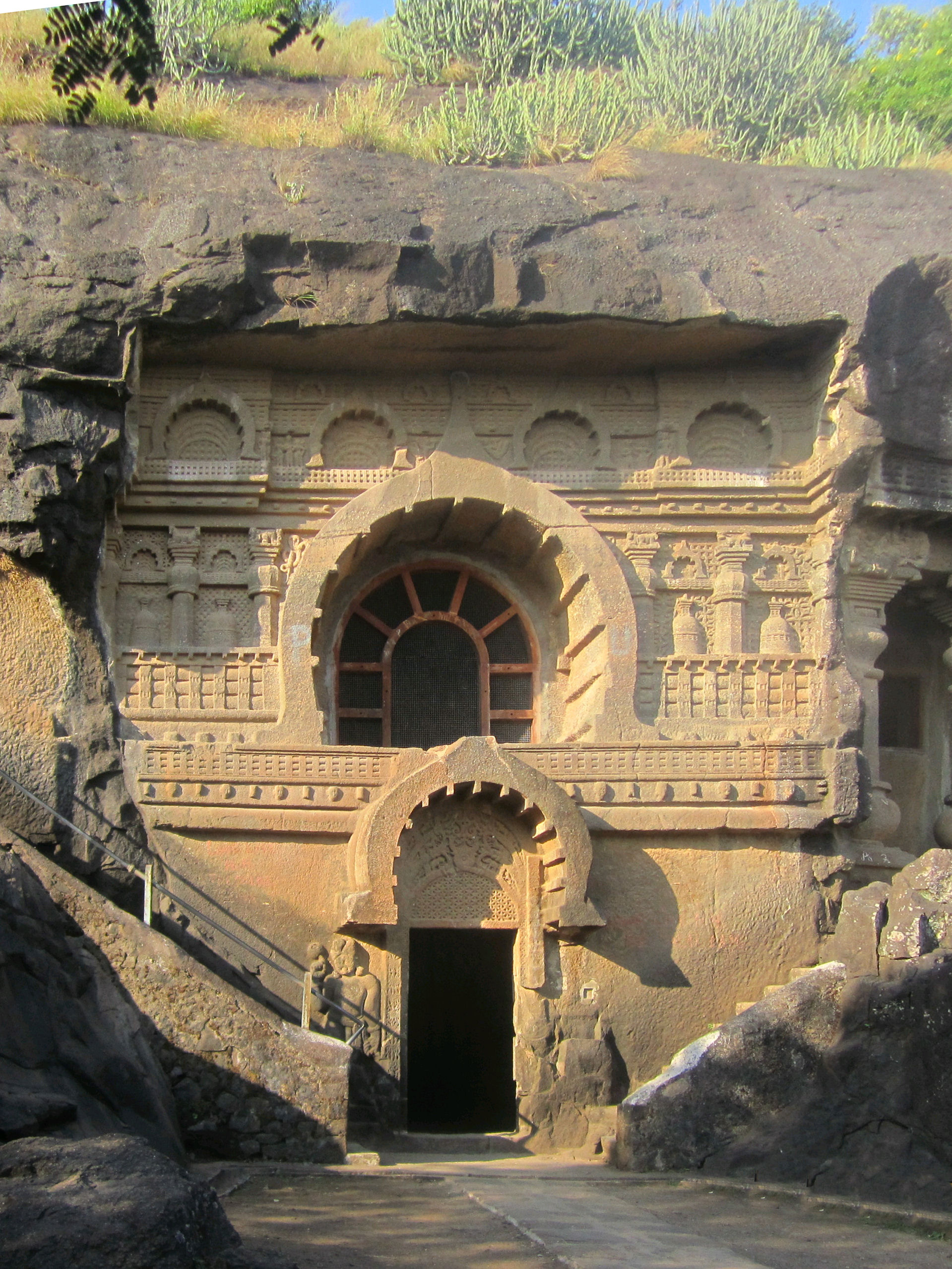
Chaitya facade at Pandavleni Caves

=== Second wave of cave construction (5th–6th century AD) ===
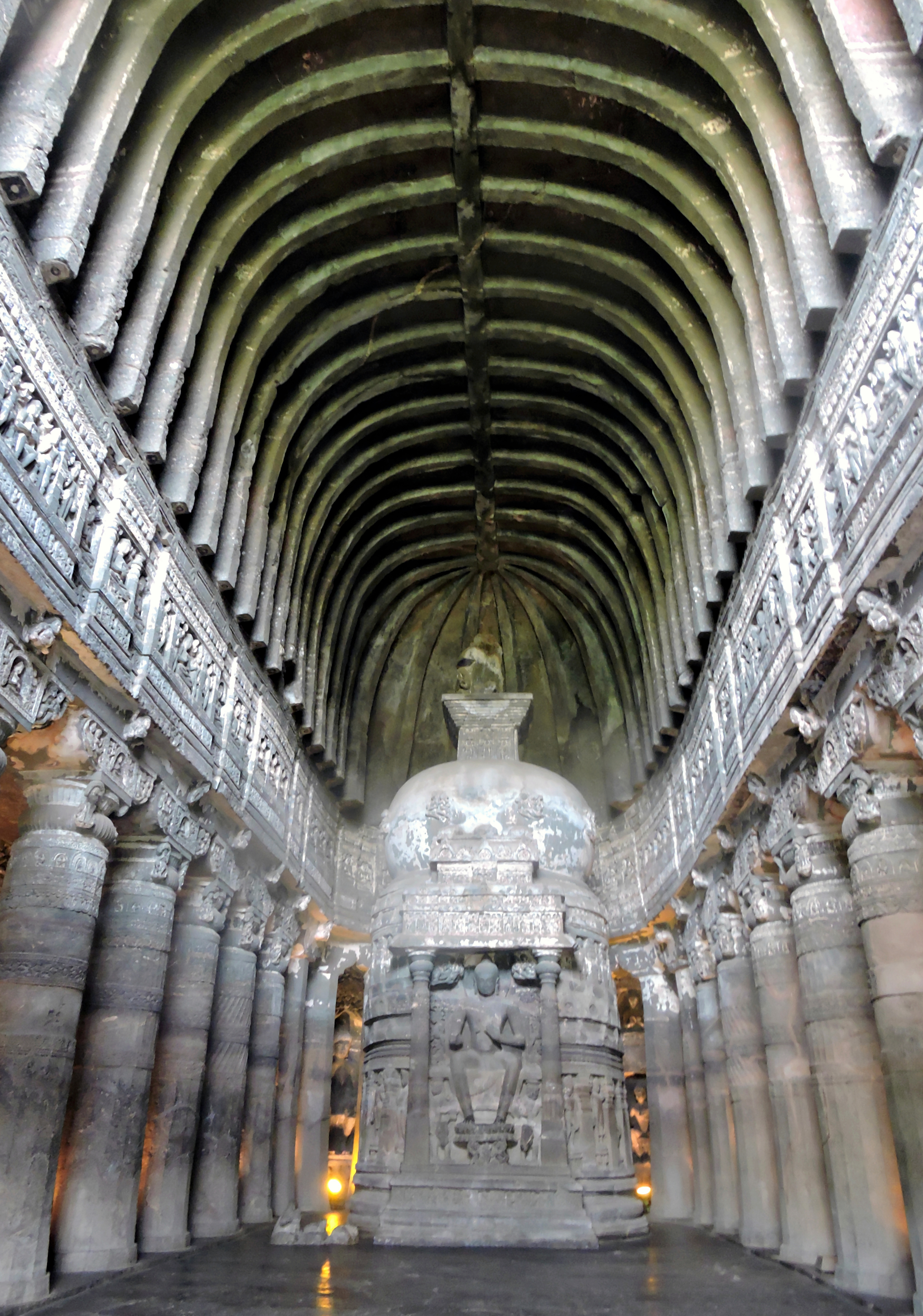
Cave 26 in Ajanta, circa 480 AD

The construction of caves would wane after the 2nd century AD, possibly due to the rise of Mahayana Buddhism and the associated intense architectural and artistic production in Gandhara and Amaravati. The building of rock-cut caves would revive briefly in the 6th century AD, with the magnificent achievements of Ajanta and Ellora, before finally subsiding as Hinduism replaced Buddhism in the sub-continent, and stand-alone temples became more prevalent.

The Ajanta Caves in Maharashtra, a World Heritage Site, are 30 rock-cut cave Buddhist temples carved into the sheer vertical side of a gorge near a waterfall-fed pool located in the hills of the Sahyadri mountains. Like all the locations of Buddhist caves, this one is located near main trade routes and spans six centuries beginning in the 2nd or 1st century B.C. A period of intense building activity at this site occurred under the Vakataka king Harisena between 460 and 478. A profuse variety of decorative sculpture, intricately carved columns and carved reliefs are found, including exquisitely carved cornices and pilaster. Skilled artisans crafted living rock to imitate timbered wood (such as lintels) in construction and grain and intricate decorative carving, although such architectural elements were ornamental and not functional in the classical sense.

Later many Hindu kings from southern India patronize many cave temples dedicated to Hindu gods and goddesses. One such prominent example of cave temple architecture are the Badami Cave Temples at Badami, the early Chalukya capital, carved out in the 6th century. There are four cave temples hewn from the sides of cliffs, three Hindu and one Jain, that contain carved architectural elements such as decorative pillars and brackets as well as finely carved sculpture and richly etched ceiling panels. Nearby are many small Buddhist cave shrines.

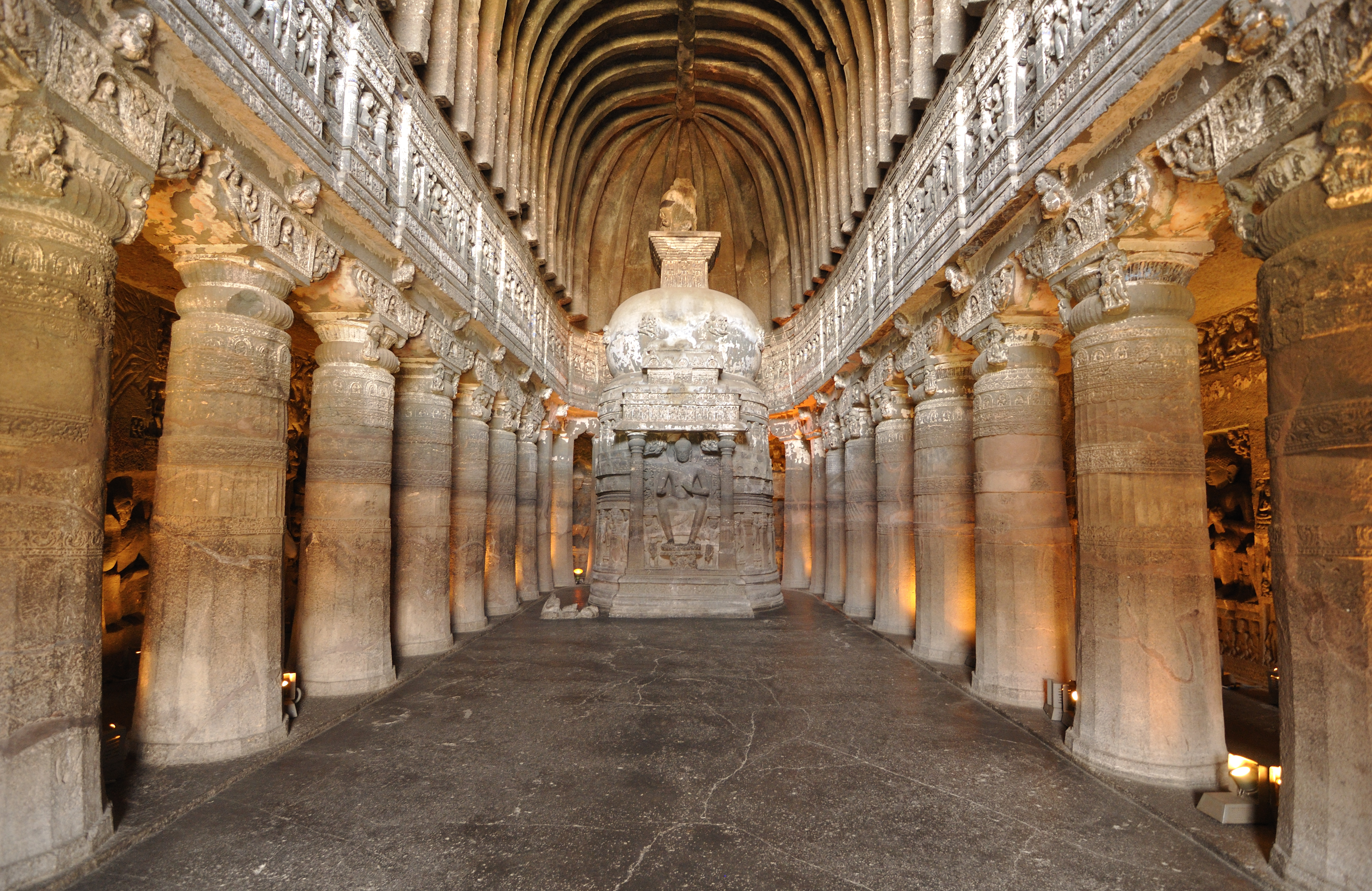
The Ajanta Caves are 30 rock-cut Buddhist cave monument built under the Vakatakas.

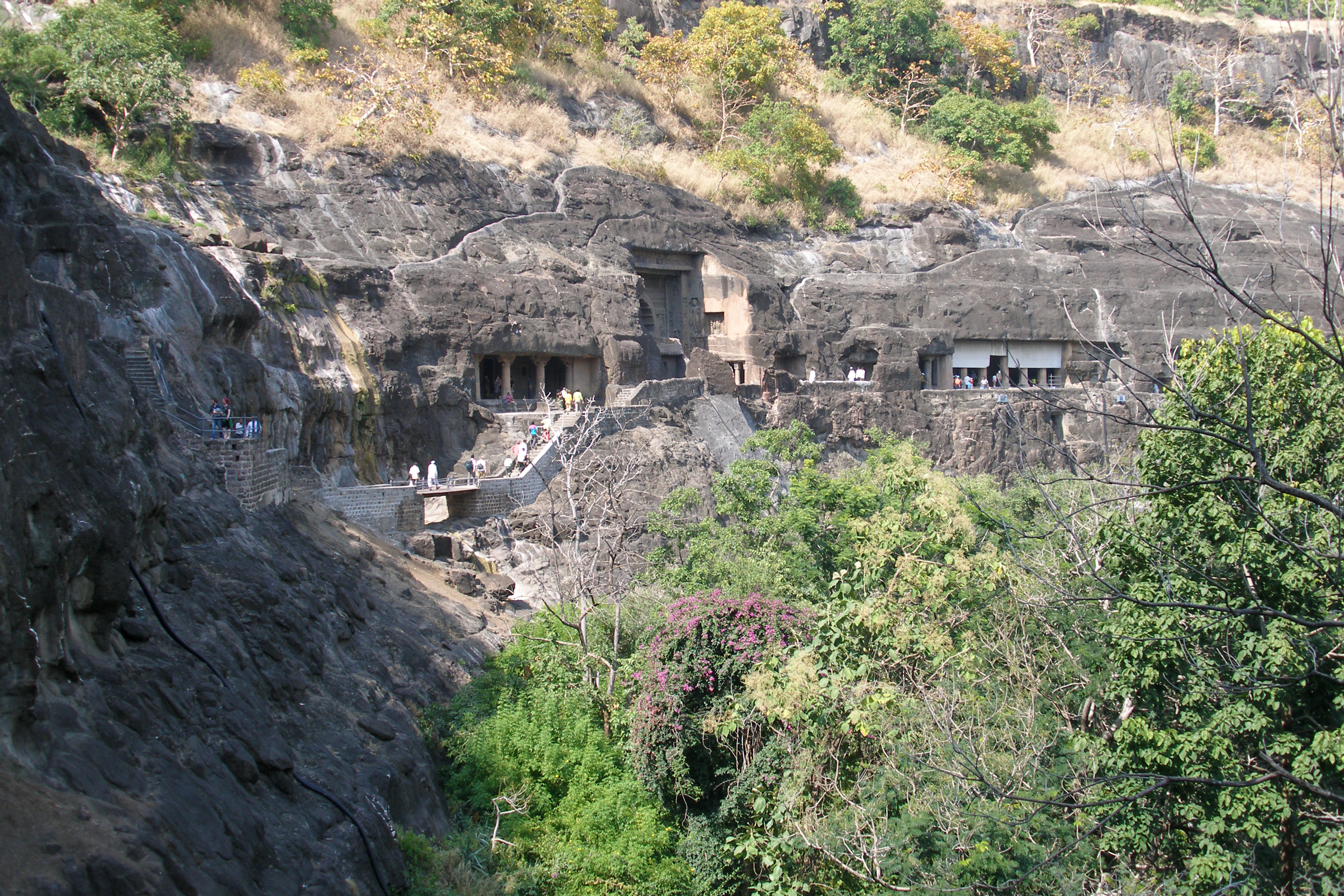
Some of the 29 Ajanta Caves

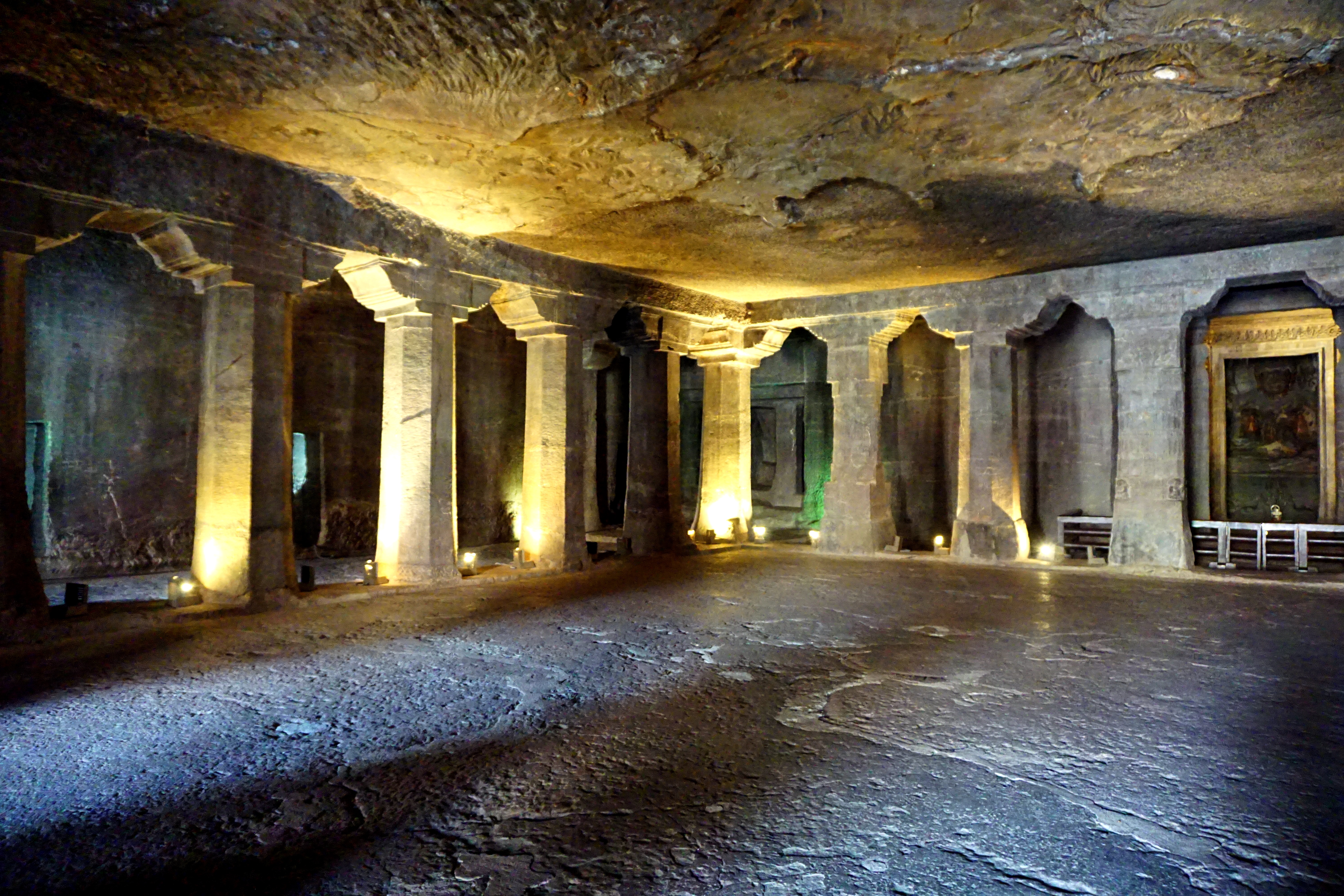
A monastery, or vihara, with its square hall surrounded by monks' cells. Ajanta Caves, no. 4.

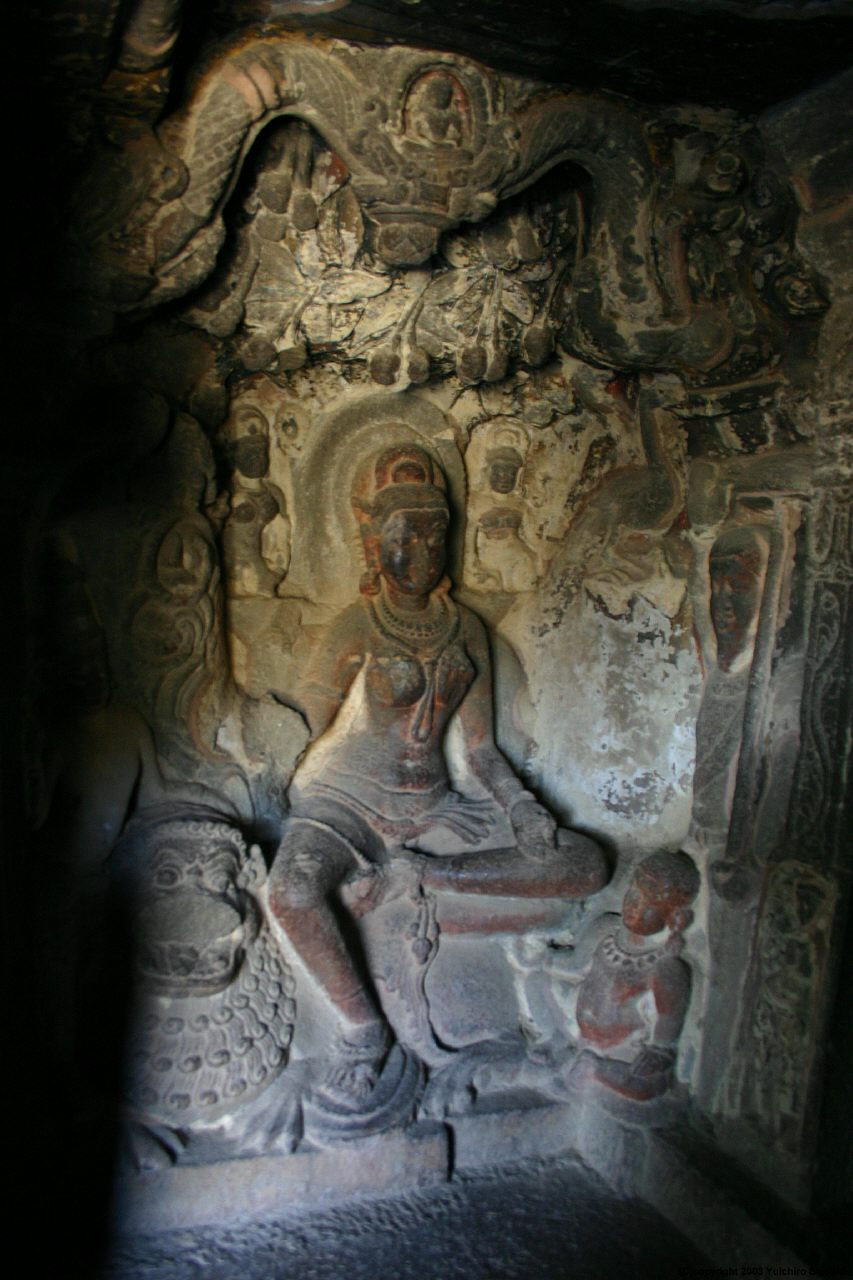
Ellora Caves. Cave 34. The yakshini Ambika, the yakshini of Neminath at a Jain Cave at Ellora

Rock-cut architecture also developed with the apparition of stepwells in India, dating from 200 to 400 CE. Subsequently, the construction of wells at Dhank (550–625 CE) and stepped ponds at Bhinmal (850–950 CE) took place.

=== Final wave of cave construction (6th–15th century CE) ===
At Ellora, on the hill to the northeast of the main complex of caves, is a Jain cave temple containing a 16-foot (4.9 m) rock-carved image of Lord Parshvanath with an inscription dated 1234/5 CE. This well preserved image is flanked by Dharaıendra and Padmavati, is still under active worship. The inscription mentions the site as Charana Hill, a holy site. This was the last excavation at Ellora. The Ankai Fort caves are thought to be from the same period.

The final wave of Indian rock-cut cave construction occurred at Gwalior with five clusters of rock-cut monuments surrounding the Gwalior fort, two centuries after the Ellora Parshvantha cave temple. They contain many monumental Jain images.

South-West Group: Now termed Trishalagiri. The group is the first one encountered when driving to the Urvai Gate, just outside the fortifications. There are the oldest Jain monuments in Gwalior from the post-Gupta period. Archaeologist L.B. Singh dates them to 6th to 8th cent AD.

South-East Group (Popularly referred to as Ek Patthar Ki Bawadi group or "Gopachal Atishya Kshetra"), Urvahi group (Siddhachal Caves, North-West group and North-East group were all excavated during the Tomar rule during 1440–1473 AD.

Babur, who visited Gwalior in AD 1527, ordered the Gwalior statues to be destroyed. However, only the faces of many of colossal Jain images were destroyed; some of them were later repaired by the local Jains.

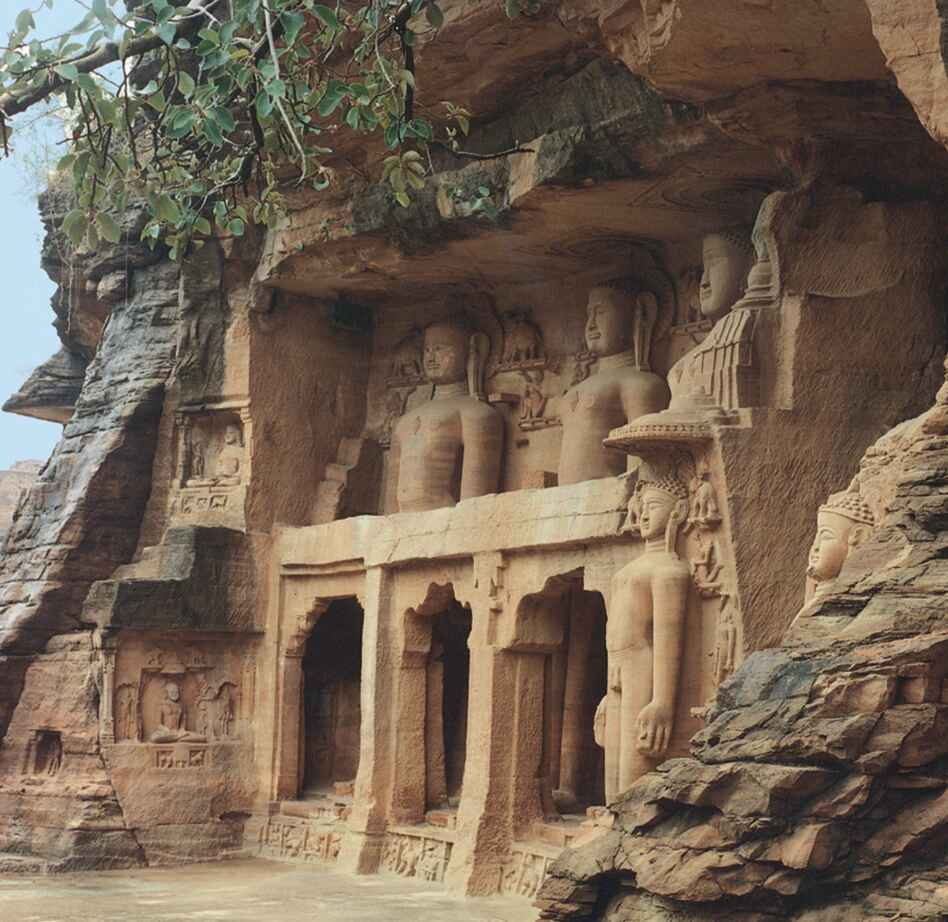
Jain statues, Siddhachal Caves

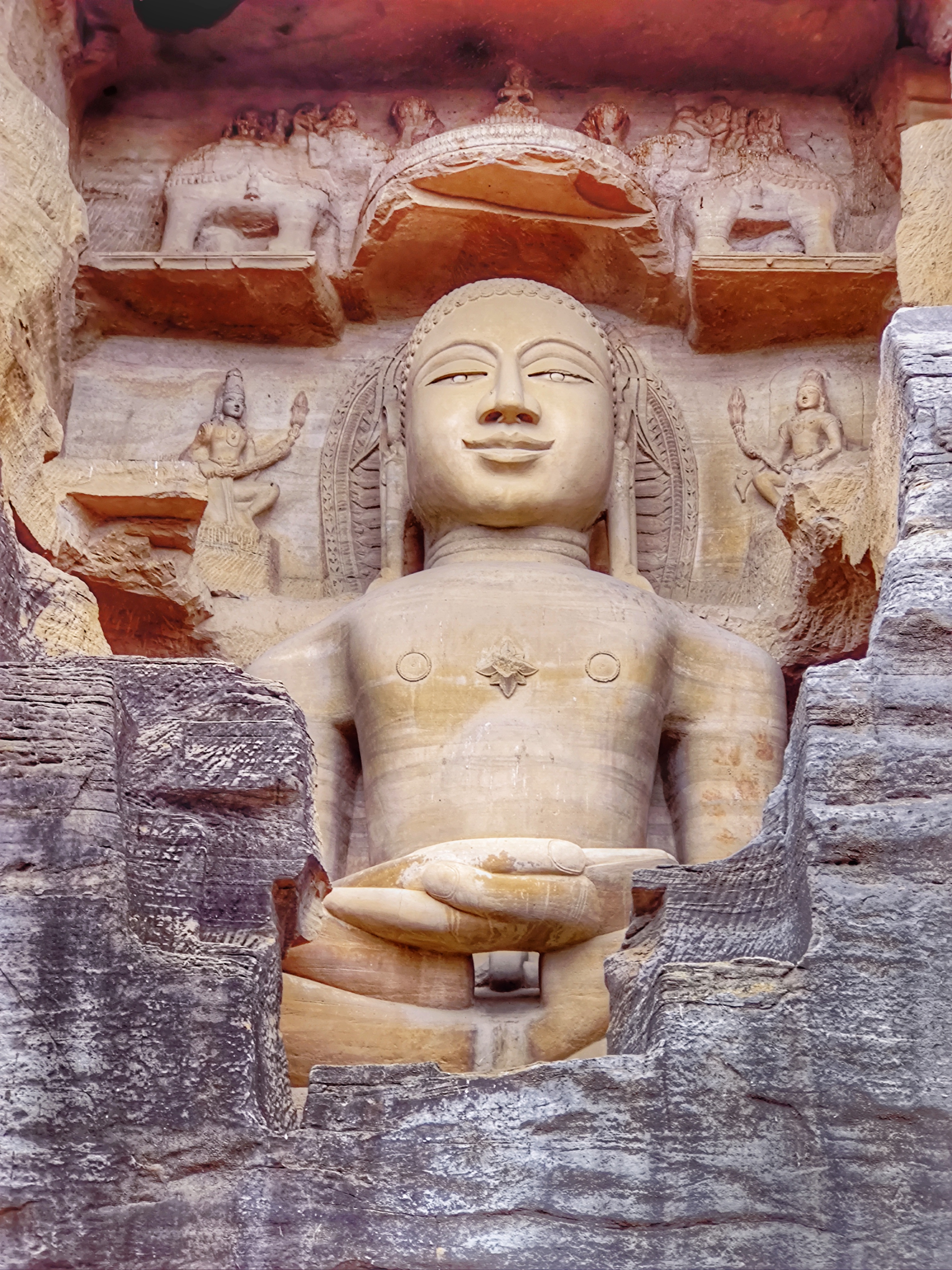
Jain Tirthankar statue, Gopachal

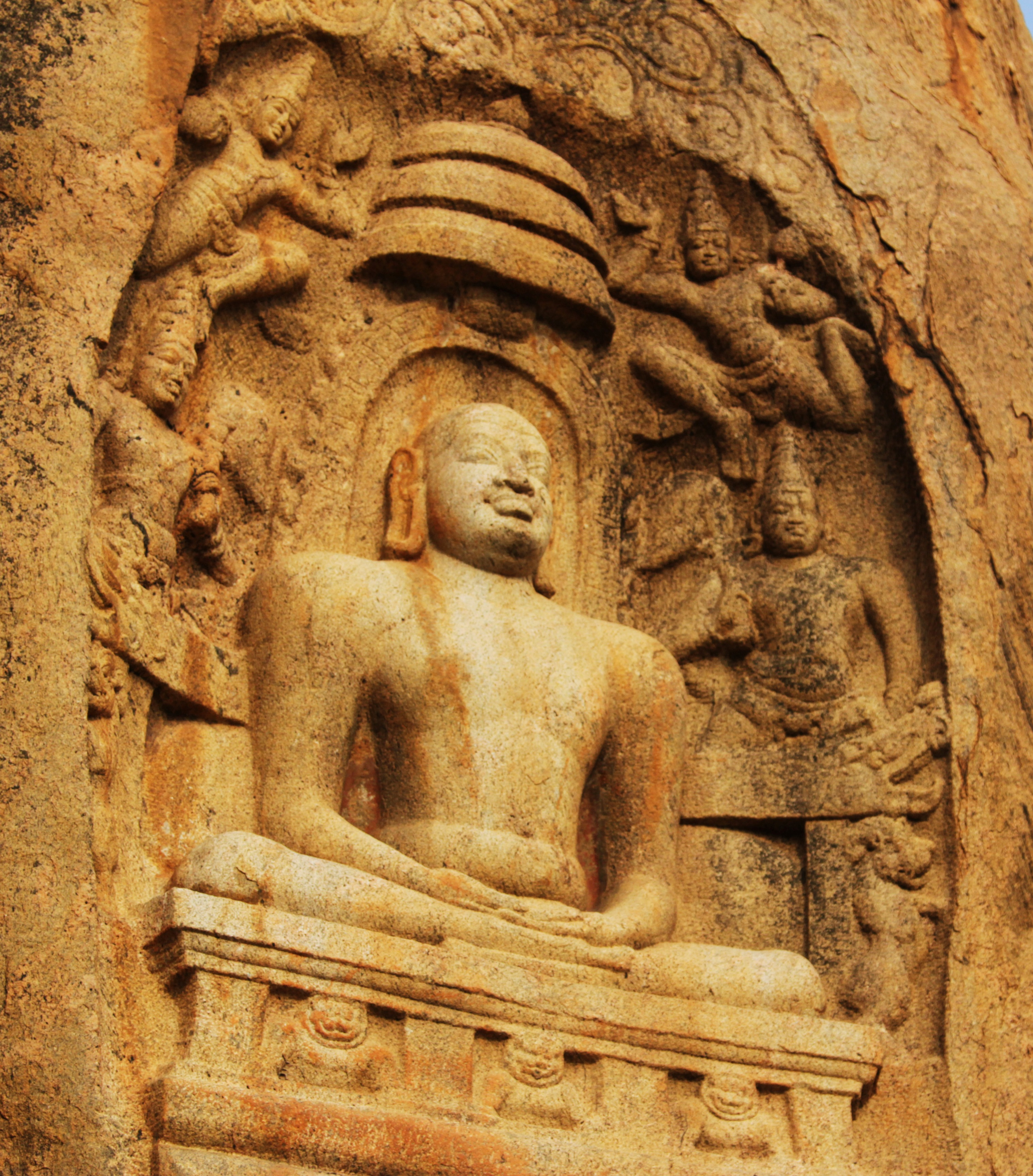
Image of Mahavira, Samanar Malai, 9th century

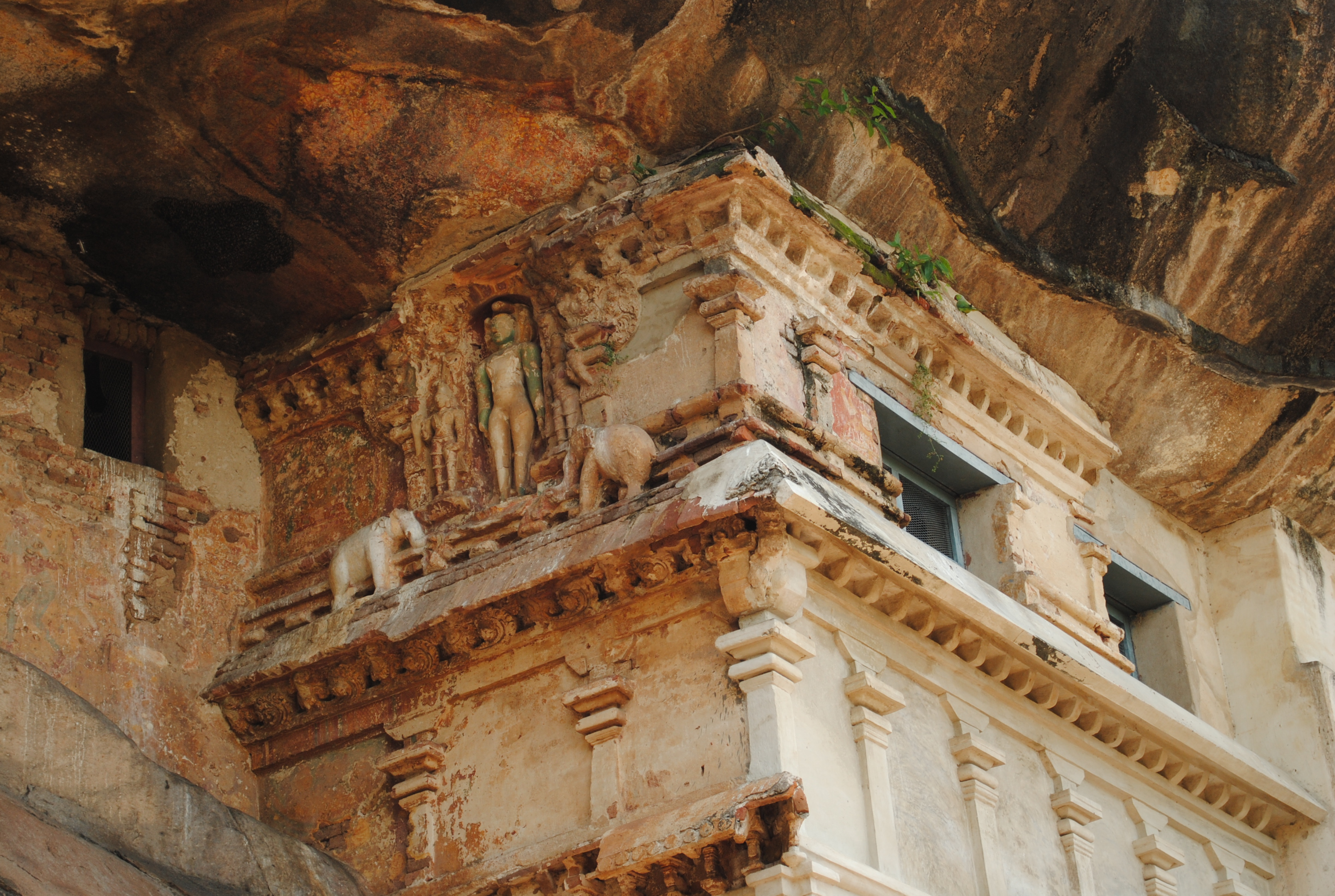
Tirumalai cave temple

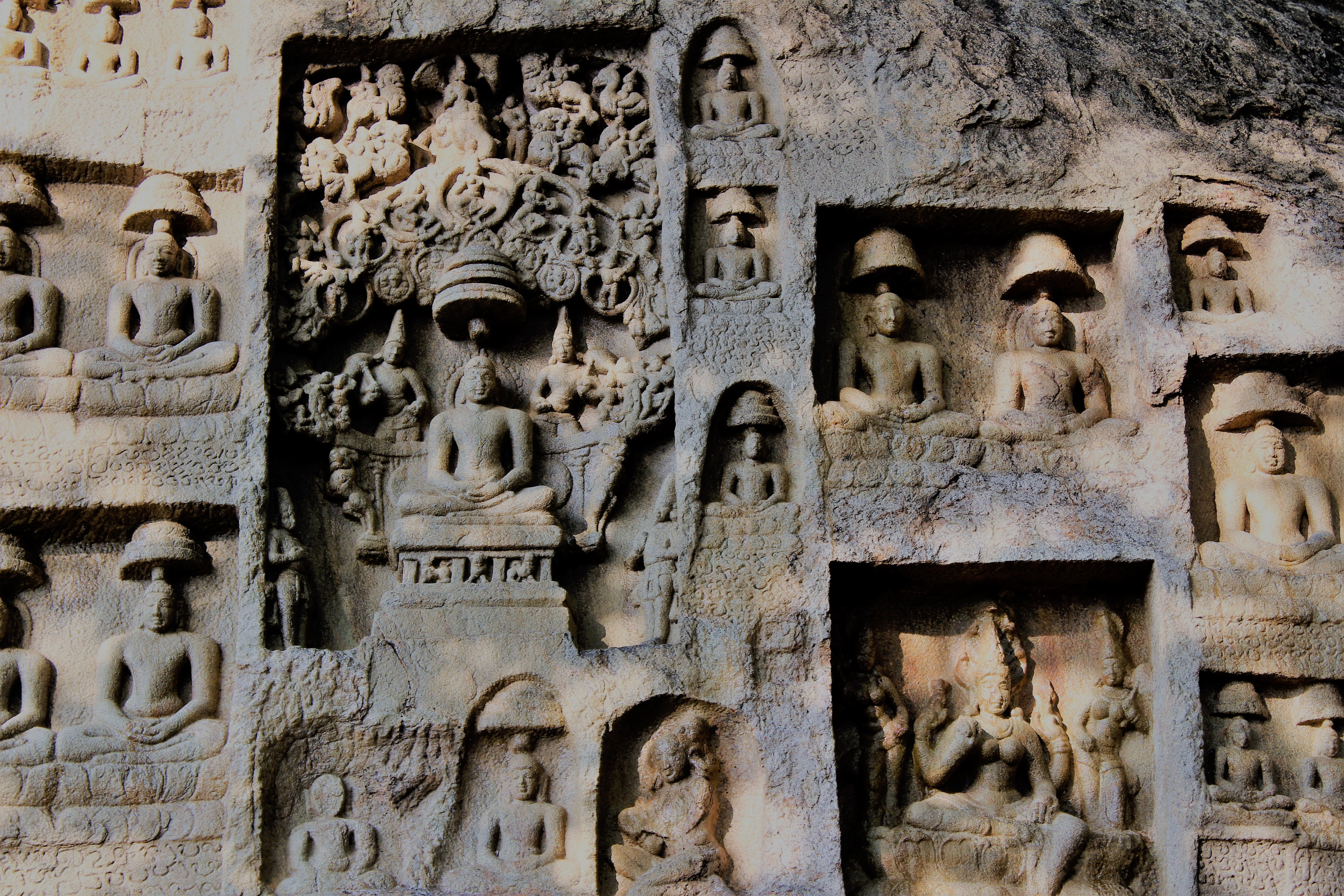
Kalugumalai Jain Beds

== Monolithic rock-cut temples ==
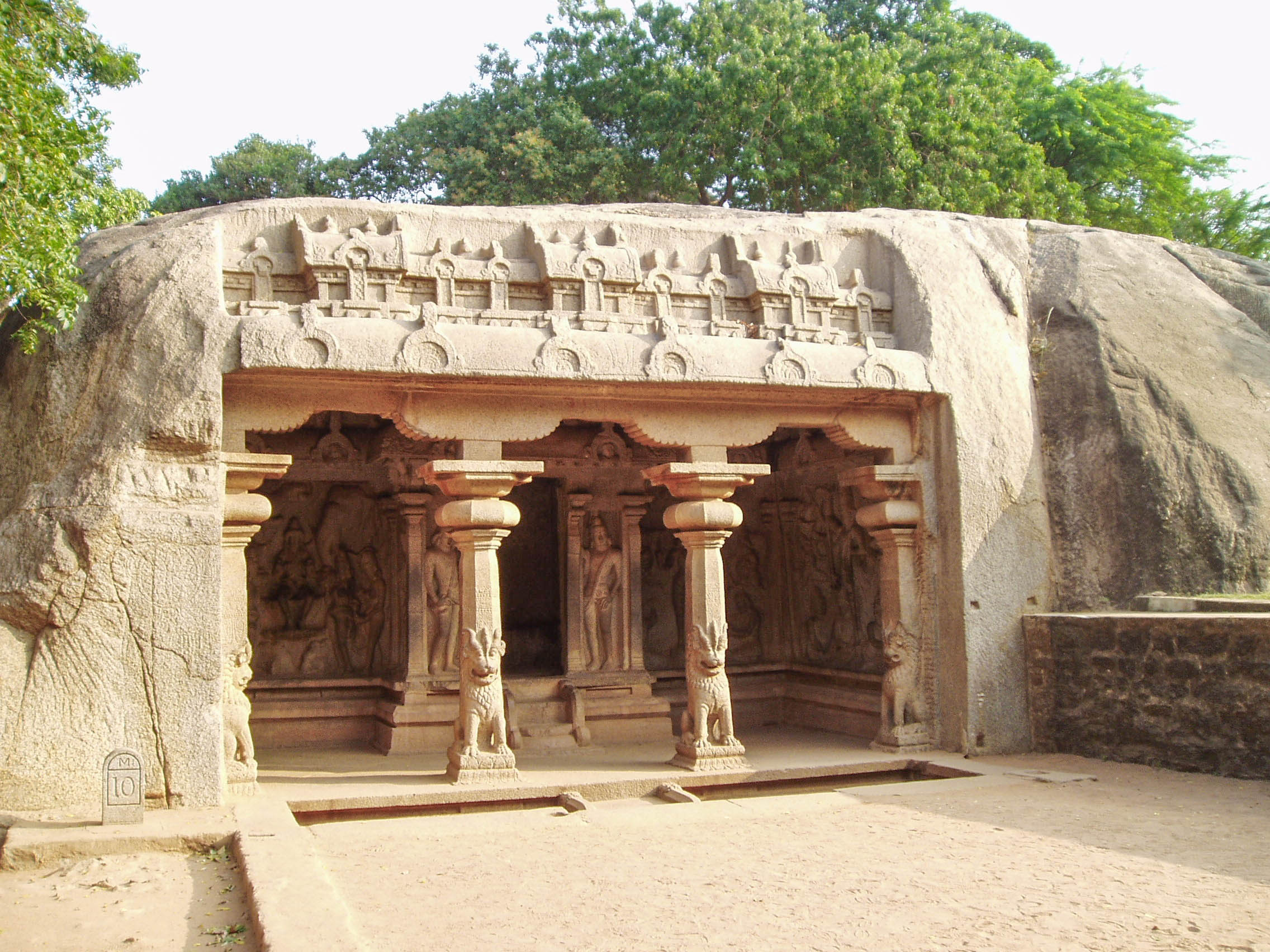
Varaha Cave Temple 7th century

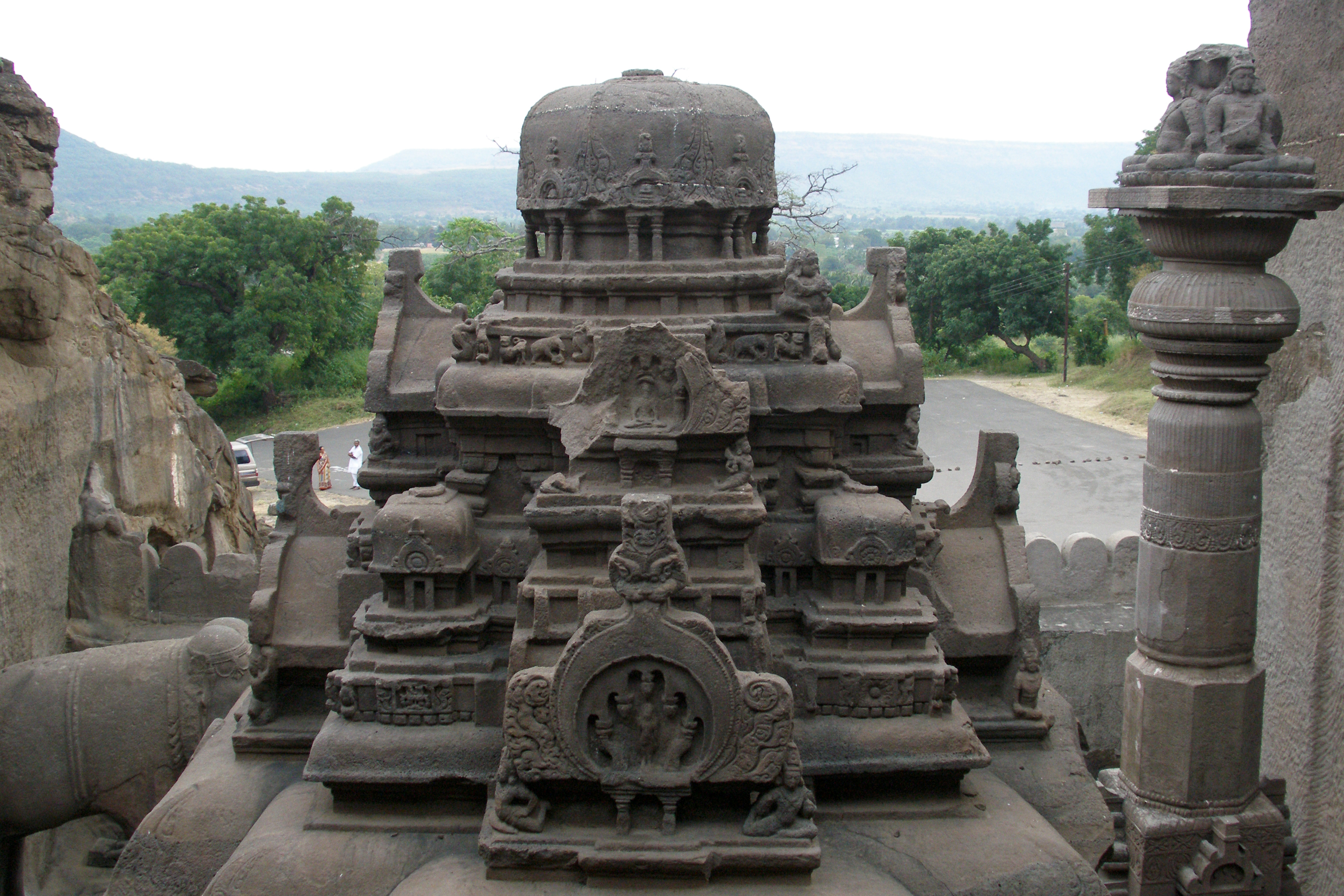
Jain cave 30 at Ellora

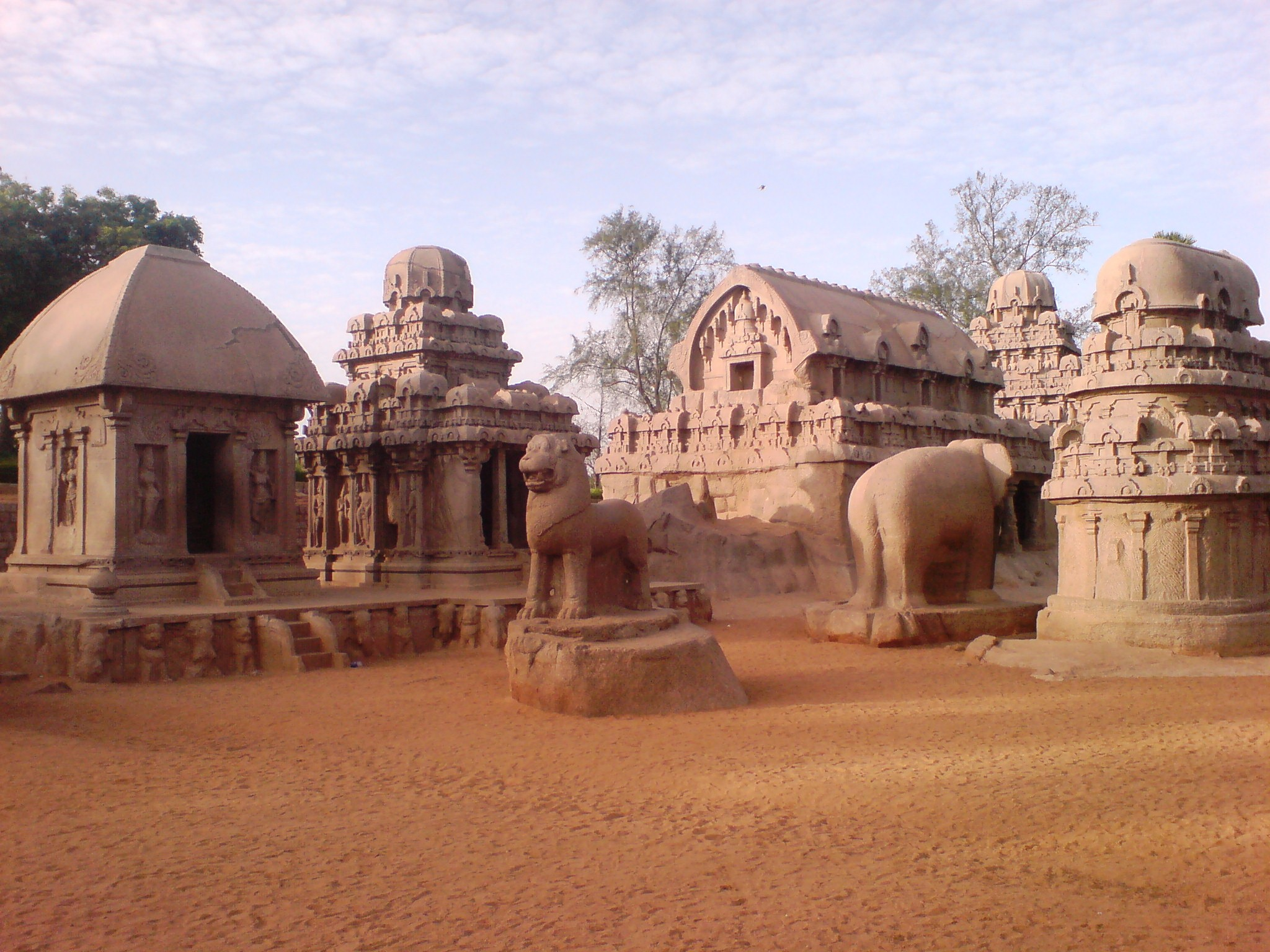
Pancha Rathas monolith rock-cut temples, late 7th century

The Pallava architects started the carving of rock for the creation of monolithic copies of structural temples. A feature of the rock-cut cave temple distribution until the time of the early Pallavas is that they did not move further south than Arakandanallur, with the solitary exception of Tiruchitrapalli on the south bank of the Kaveri River, the traditional southern boundary between north and south. Also, good granite exposures for rock-cut structures were generally not available south of the river.

A rock cut temple is carved from a large rock and excavated and cut to imitate a wooden or masonry temple with wall decorations and works of art. Pancha Rathas is an example of monolith Indian rock cut architecture dating from the late 7th century located at Mamallapuram, a UNESCO World Heritage Site.

Ellora cave temple 16, the Kailash Temple, is singular in that it was excavated from the top down rather than by the usual practice of carving into the scarp of a hillside. The Kailash Temple was created through a single, huge top-down excavation 100 feet deep down into the volcanic basaltic cliff rock. It was commissioned in the 8th century by King Krishna I and took more than 100 years to complete. The Kailash Temple, or cave 16 as it is known at Ellora Caves located at Maharashtra on the Deccan Plateau, is a huge monolithic temple dedicated to Lord Shiva. There are 34 caves built at this site, but the other 33 caves, Hindu, Buddhist, and Jain, were carved into the side of the plateau rock. The effect of the Kailash Temple is that of a free-standing temple surrounded by smaller cave shrines carved out of the same black rock. The Kailash Temple is carved with figures of gods and goddesses from the Hindu Puranas, along with mystical beings like the heavenly nymphs and musicians and figures of good fortune and fertility. Ellora Caves is also a World Heritage Site.

There is no timeline that divides the creation of rock-cut temples and free-standing temples built with cut stone as they developed in parallel. The building of free-standing structures, especially Buddhist temples, began in the 3rd century BC, whereas Hindu temples started to be built from the 5th century AD. Meanwhile, rock cut temples continued to be excavated until the 12th century.

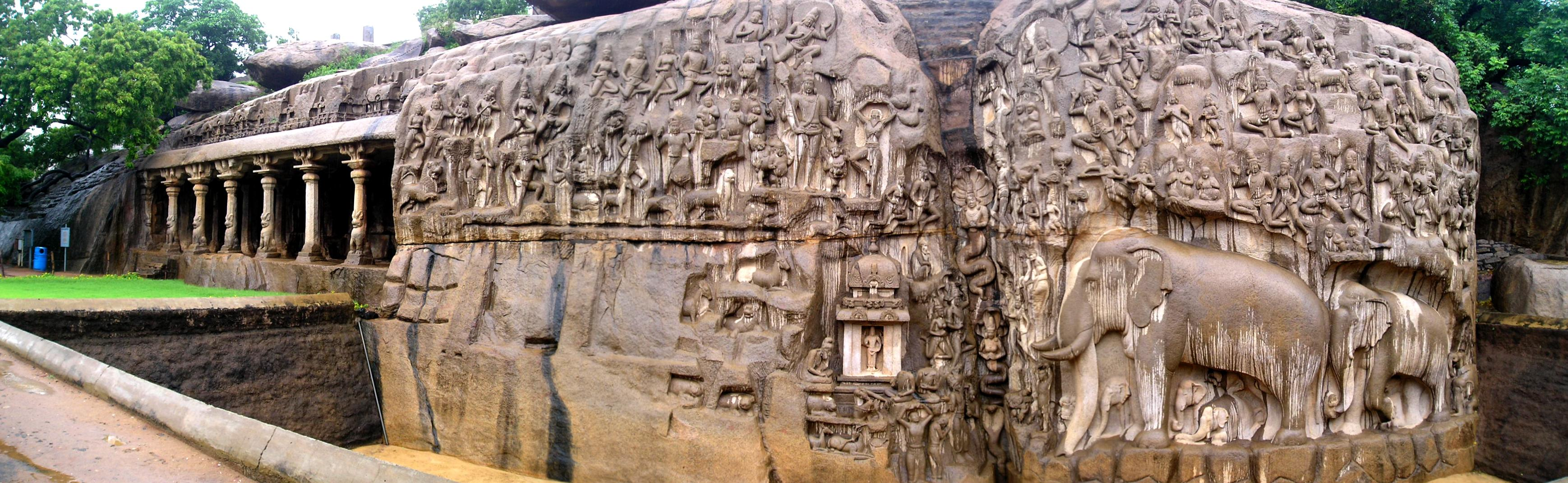
The Descent of the Ganges, also known as Arjuna's Penance, at Mamallapuram, is one of the largest rock reliefs in Asia and features in several Hindu myths.

== Stepwells ==
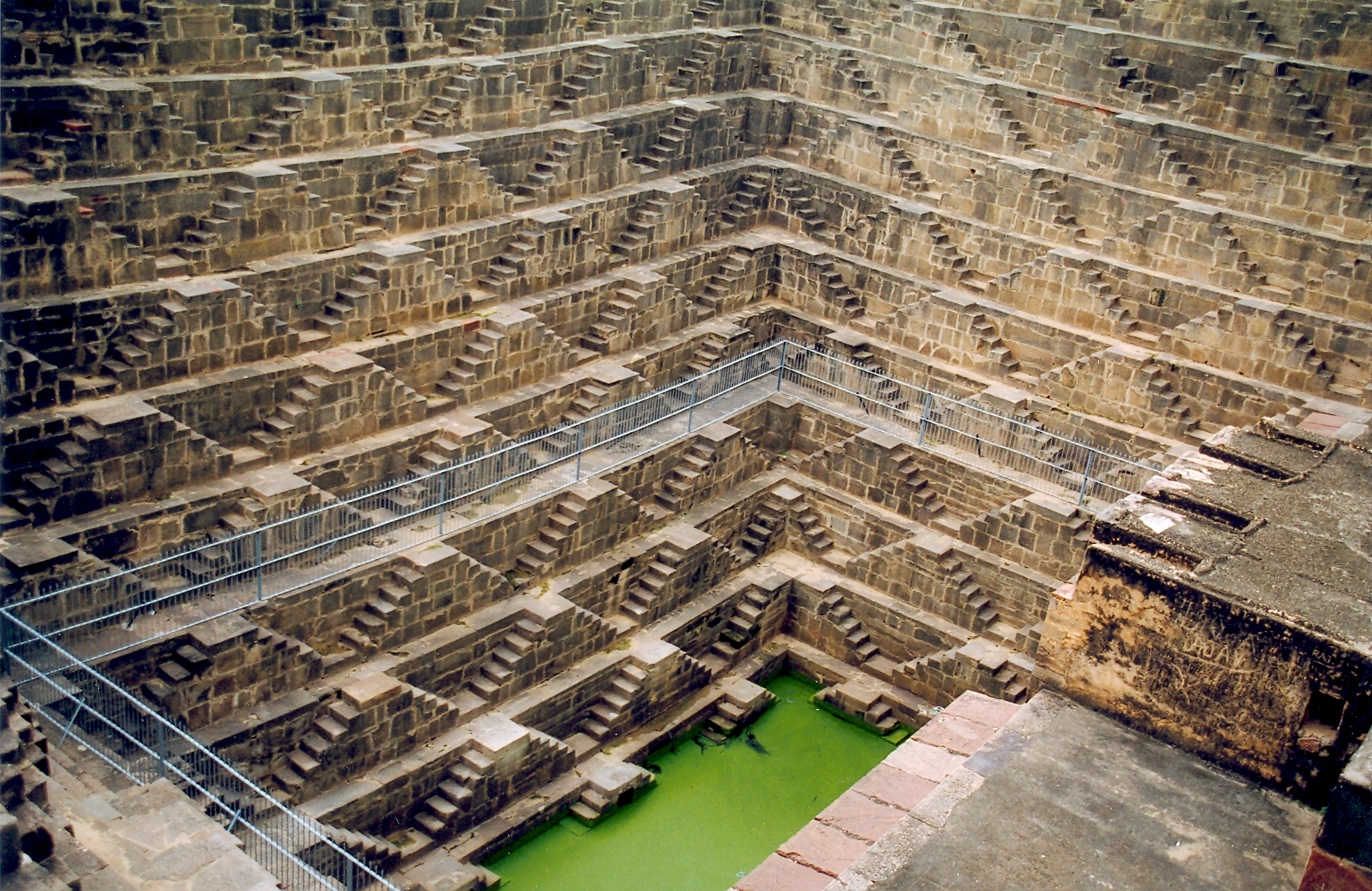
Chand Baori, Abhaneri near Bandikui, Rajasthan, is one of the deepest and largest stepwells in India

The stepwell is a large hole in the ground with steps at one or more sides. They are used in India to collect and conserve water from the monsoon rains, for use in the dry season. The steps allow access to the water whatever level it is at. They have a history of around 4,000 years in India, first appearing in the Bronze Age Indus Valley civilization, reappearing around the 5th century CE, and then constructed until relatively recent times, with some still in use. Many have walls lined with stone brought from elsewhere for the purpose, but many are truly rock-cut. The most elaborate are highly decorated. They are mostly found in drier states such as Gujarat and Rajasthan. Famous examples include: Chand Baori, Rani ki vav, Step-well of Ambapur, and the Dada Harir Stepwell.

== Gallery ==
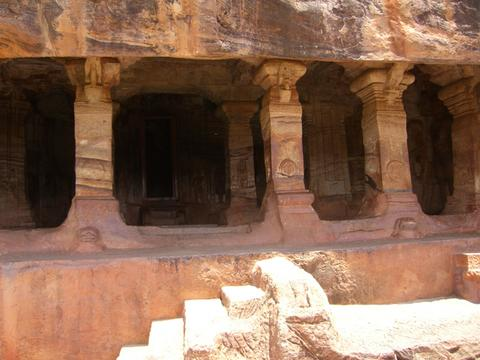
Jain Badami cave

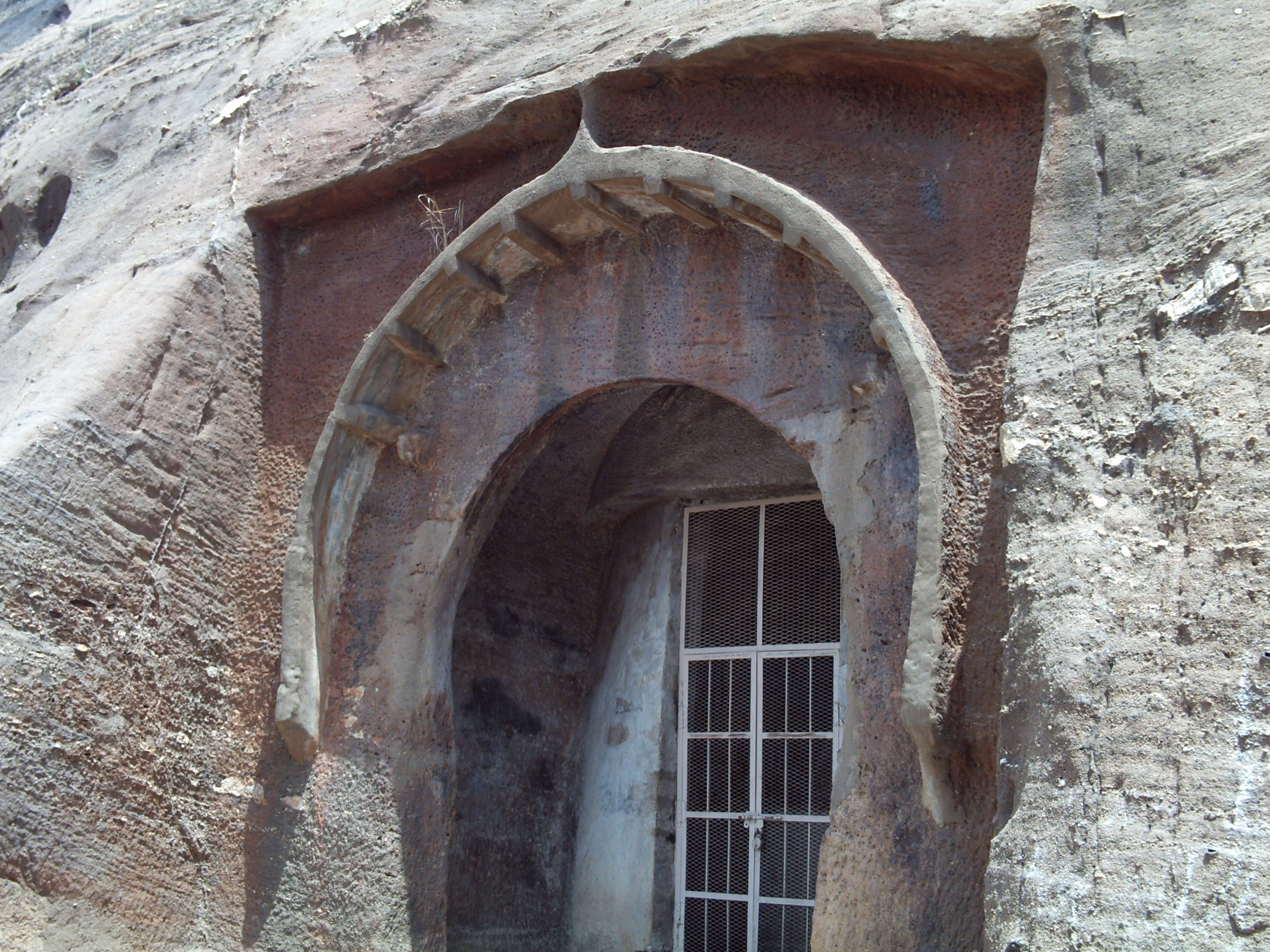
Entrance of Rockcut cave temple (Similar style as Barabar Caves) at Guntupalle, Andhra Pradesh

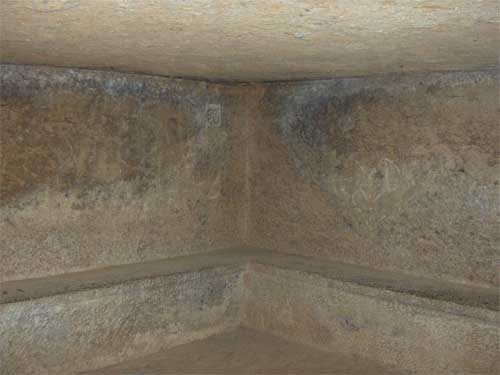
Advanced beds in early viharas at Kanheri Caves

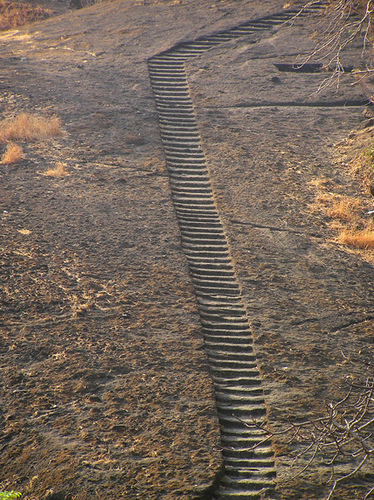
Rock cut stair leading to Kanheri

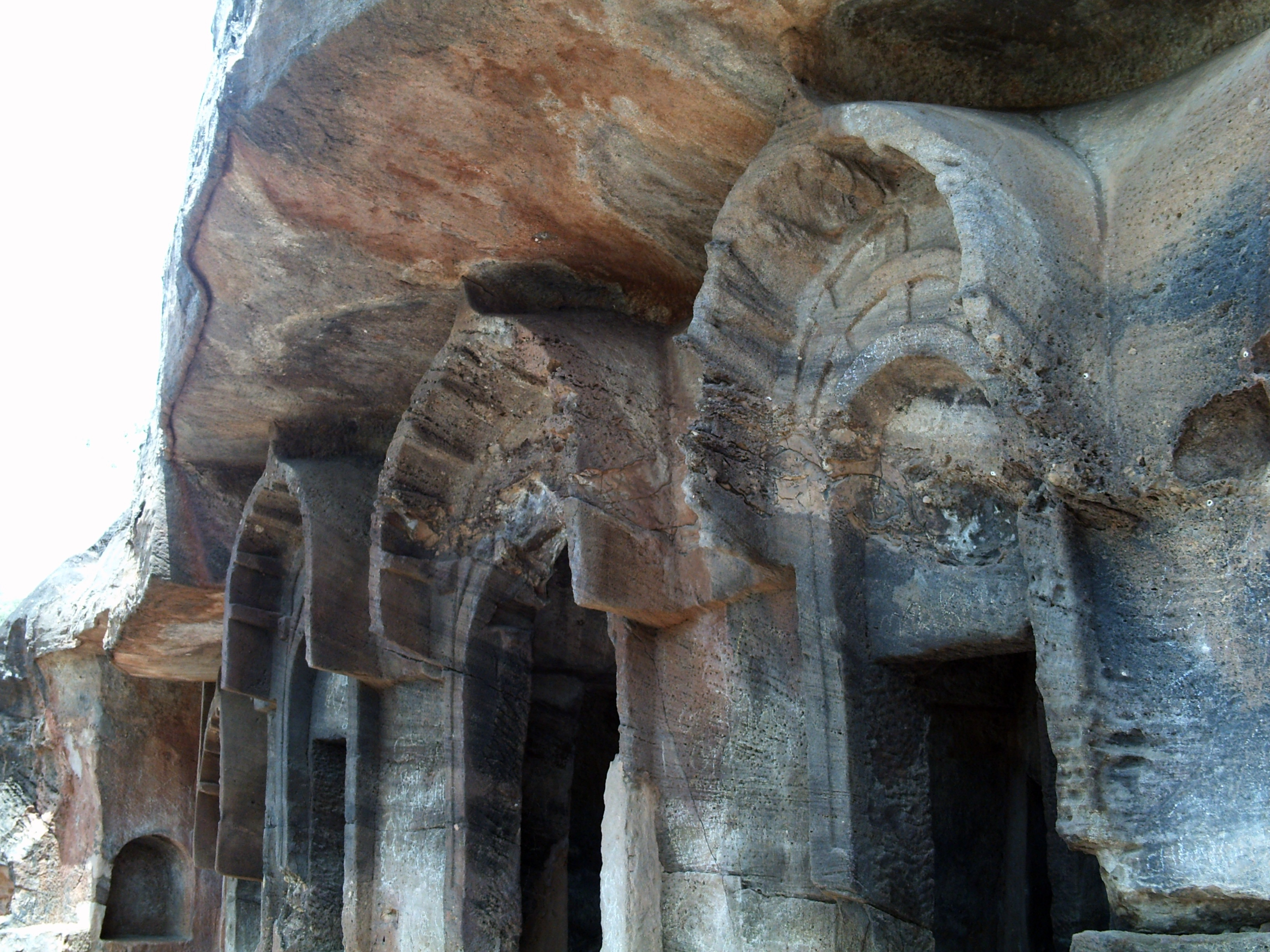
Guntupalle Rockcut Caves, Andhra Pradesh

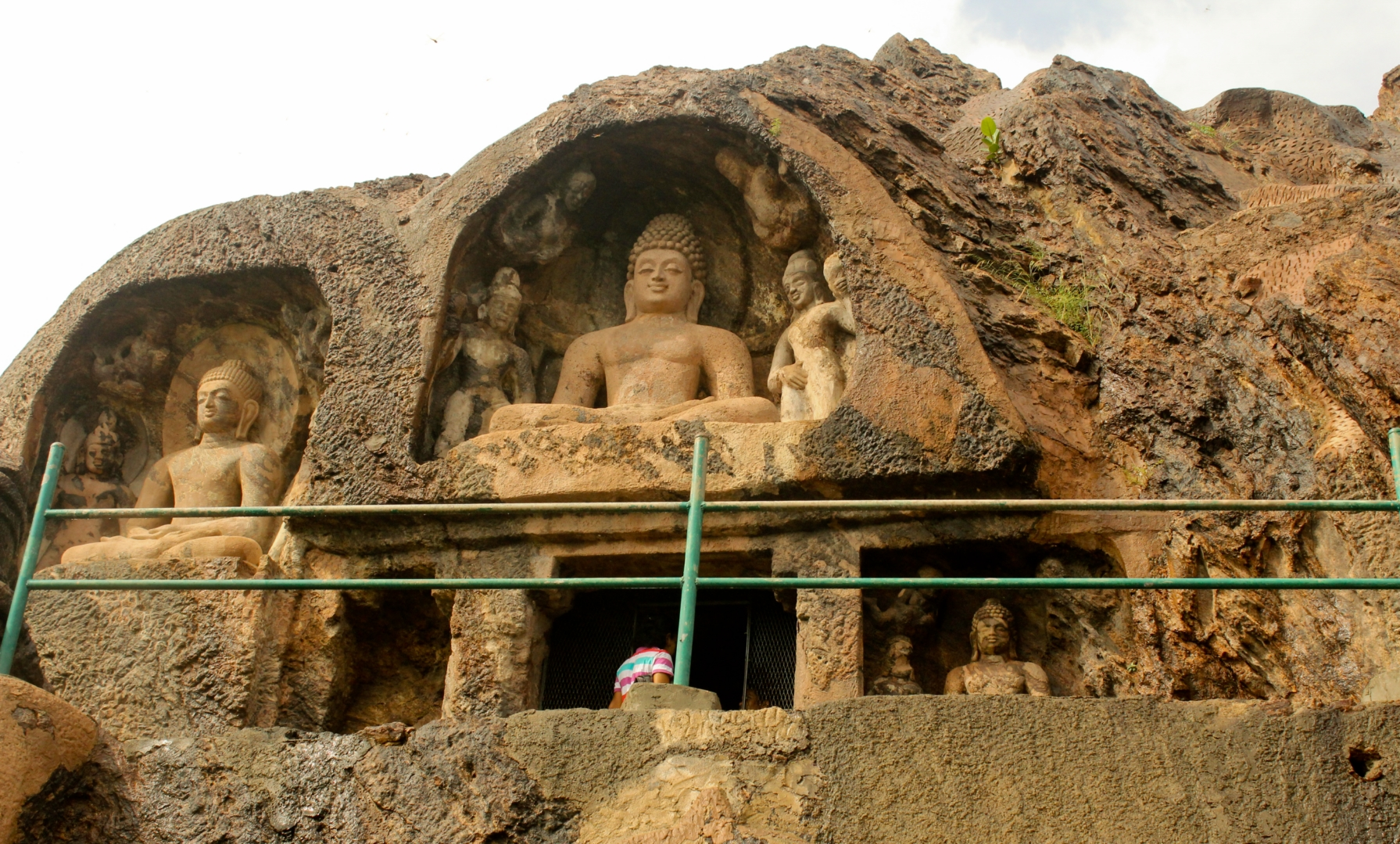
Rock cut Buddha statues, Bojjannakonda

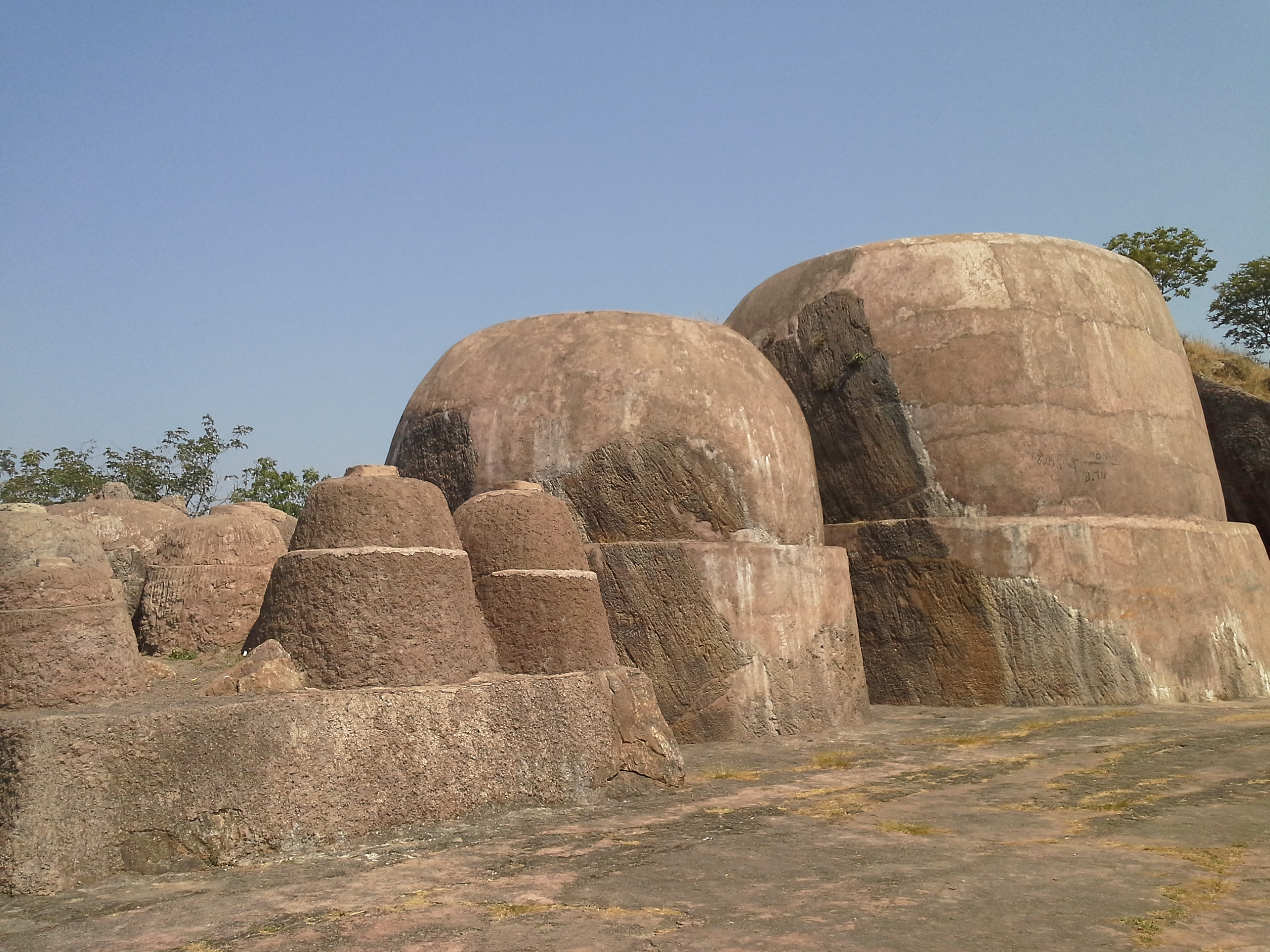
View of large Rock cut stone Stupas at Lingalakonda, Andhra Pradesh

== Rock-cut monuments in India ==
- Aihole has 3 Jaina temple
- Ajanta Caves
- Aurangabad Caves
- Badami Cave Temples
- Bagh Caves
- Elephanta Caves
- Ellora Caves has 12 Buddhist, 17 Hindu and 5 Jain temples.
- Gopachal rock cut Jain monuments, Gwalior
- Kanheri Caves
- Lenyadri Caves
- Mahabalipuram
- Pancha Rathas
- Kazhuku Malai
- Pandavleni Caves
- Pitalkhora
- Undavalli caves, Andhra Pradesh
- Varaha Cave Temple at Mamallapuram
- Masroor Temple at Kangra
- Bojjannakonda Buddhist Site, Andhra Pradesh
- Guntupalle Buddhist Site, Andhra Pradesh
- Ramatheertham, Andhra Pradesh
- Gommateshwara statue, Shravanabelagola

== See also ==
- Cave research in India
- List of Caves in India
- List of rock-cut temples in India
- Rock relief
- New Seven Wonders of the World
- List of archaeological sites sorted by country
- List of colossal sculpture in situ
- List of megalithic sites
