= Ambapur, Gujarat =

Ambapur Buddhisthal (before 20th Century)
- Village
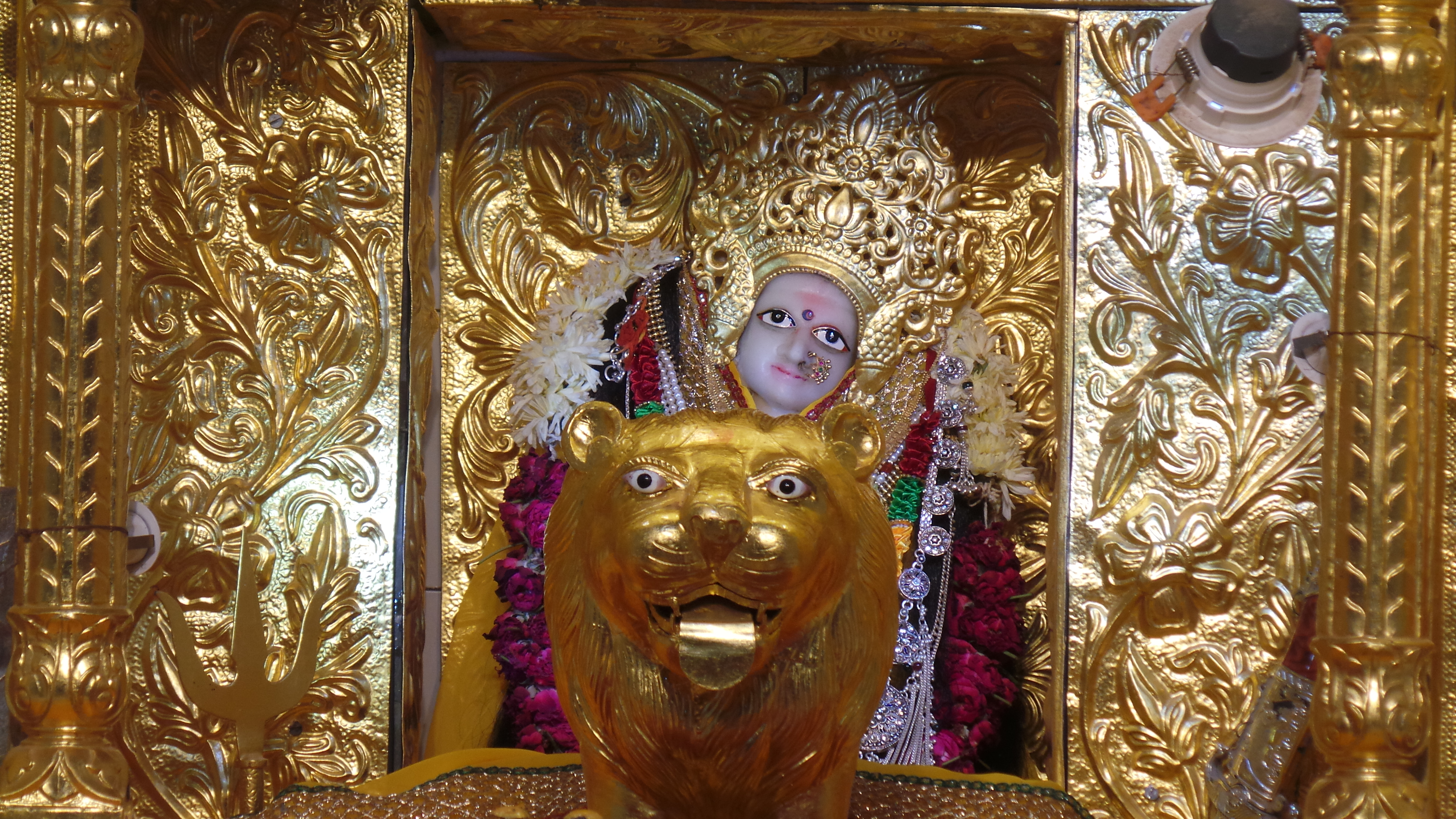
- During Festivals of Aaso Sud Chaudas

- Location in Gujarat, India Ambapur (India)
- Coordinates: 23.150719°N 72.610220°E
- Country: India
- State: Gujarat
- District: Gandhinagar

Population (2011)
  - Total: 3,387

Languages
  - Official: Gujarati
- Time zone: UTC+5:30 (IST)
- PIN: 382421
- Website: http://ambapur.in

Ambapur is a village located in Gandhinagar district in the state of Gujarat, India. The village is located at about 10 km from the state capital, Gandhinagar. The village follows the Panchayati raj system(Now under municipal corporation). The village has undergone a transformation under the panchayat.

Ambapur is widely famous for Step-well of Ambapur and Shree Akhand Jyoti Swaroop AmbeMaa Temple.

== Demographics ==
As of 2001 India census, Ambapur had a population of 3387. Males constitute 52% of the population and females 48%.
