= Ambapur Stepwell =

Step-well of Ambapur
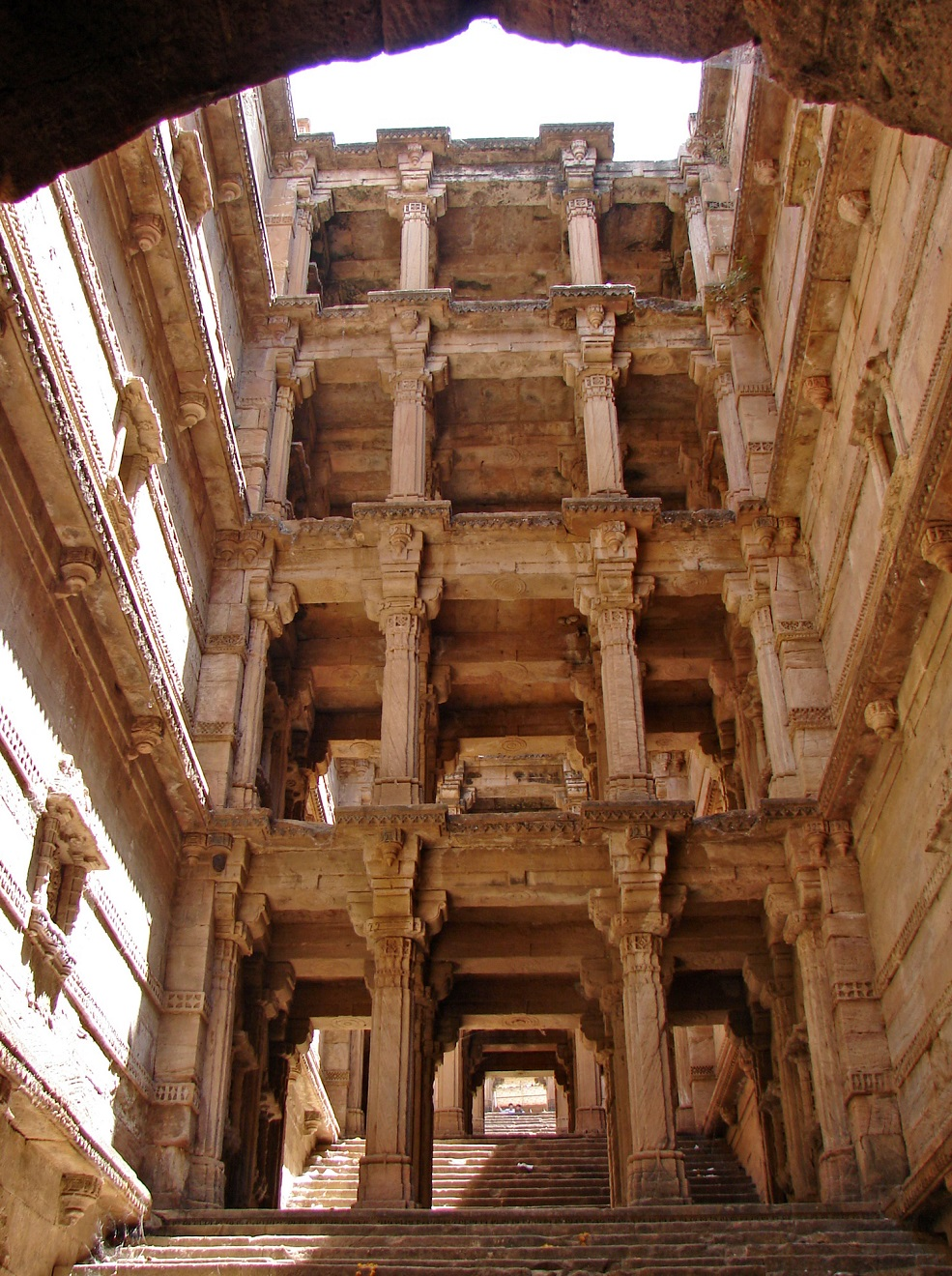
- Interactive map of the Step-well of Ambapur area

General information
- Architectural style: Hindu and Islamic architecture
- Location: Gandhinagar, Gujarat
- Coordinates: 23.151821°N 72.610853°E
- Completed: 15th century

Technical details
- Size: Five-storied deep well

Design and construction
- Architect: Local

The step-well of Ambapur is a stepwell in the village of Ambapur, close to the state capital, Gandhinagar. The stepwell is believed to be built in the 15th century although it doesn't have any inscription. The step-well or 'Vav', as it is called in Gujarati, is intricately carved and is five stories in depth. Such step wells were once integral to the semi-arid regions of Gujarat as they provided basic water needs for drinking, washing and bathing. These wells were also venues for festivals and sacred rituals.

== Gallery ==
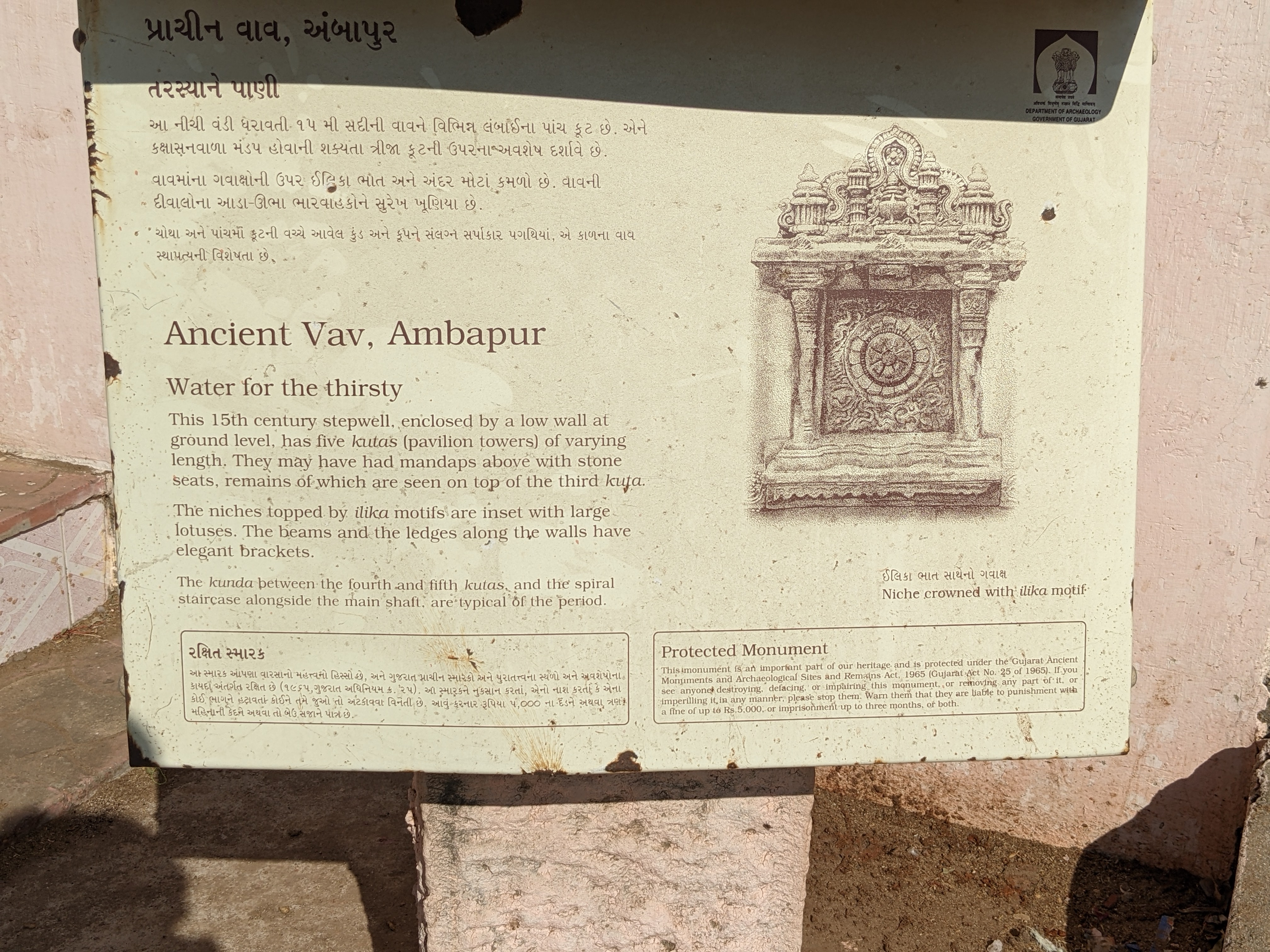
Information board

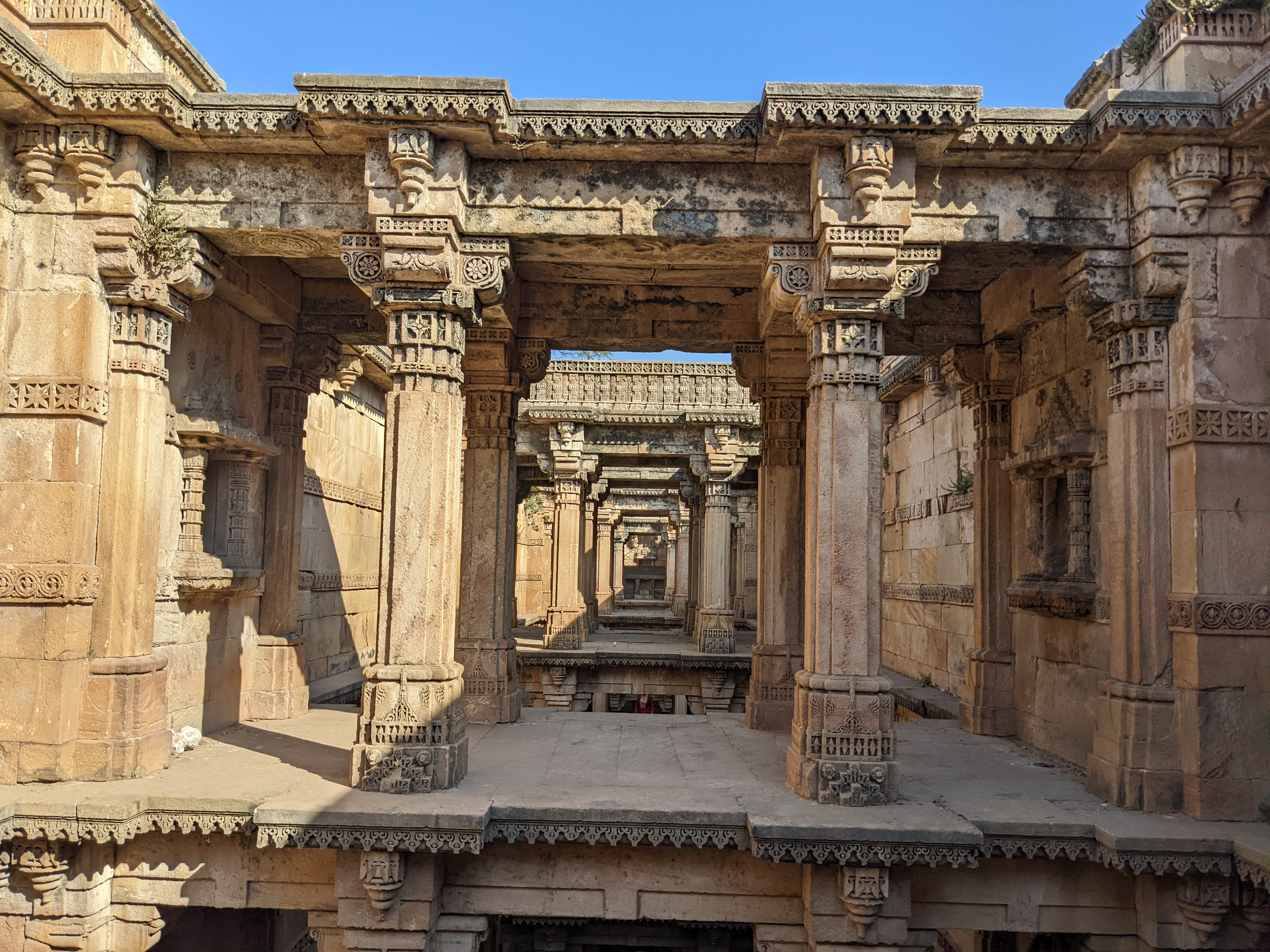
Pillars
