= Buddhist caves in India =

Various man-made, often monk-made Buddhist caves throughout India

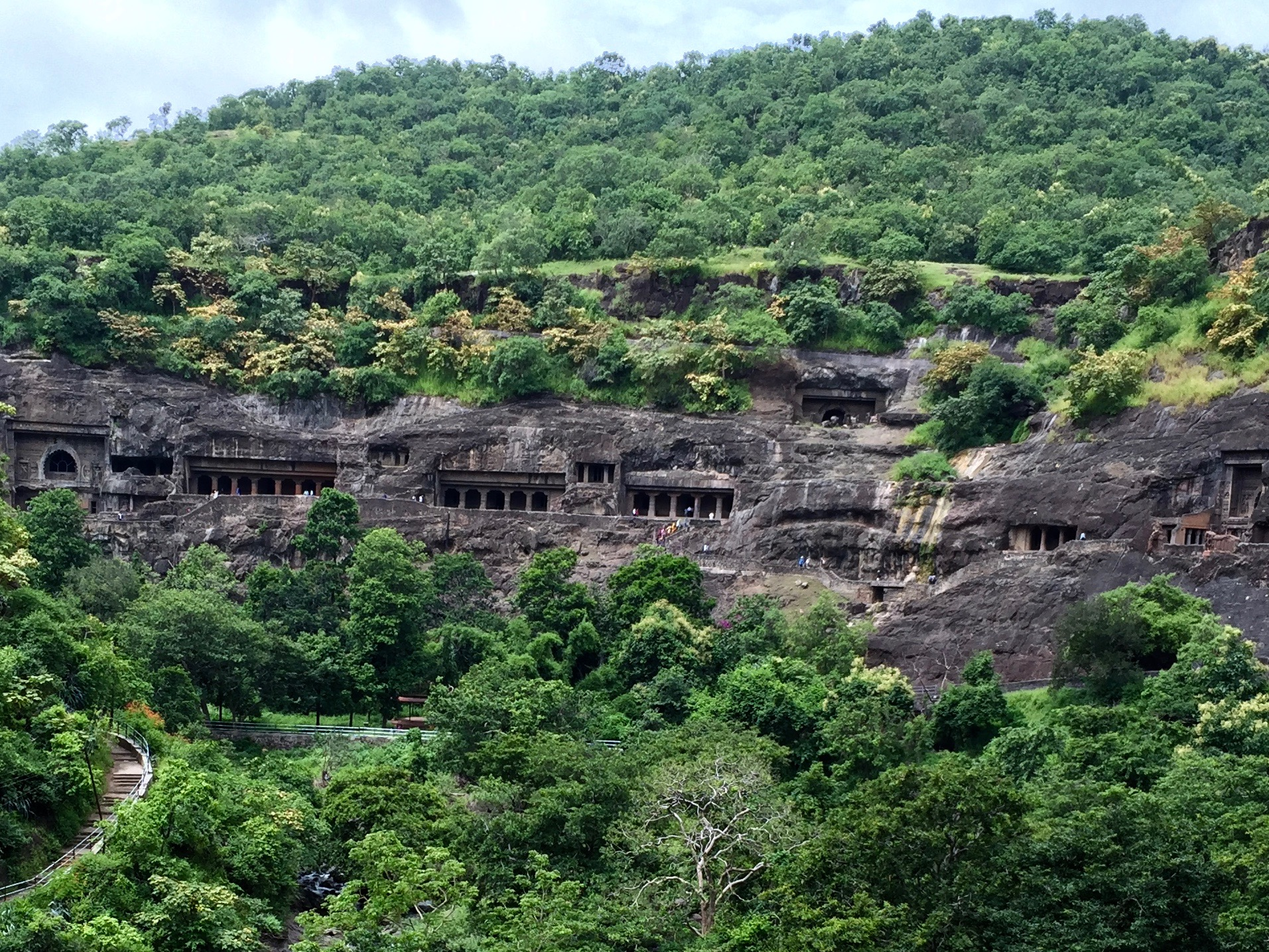
- Ajanta Caves
- Material: Rocks
- Created: 3rd century BCE~
- Present location: India

Location
- Caves of the time of the Buddha (5th century BCE); Caves of the time of Ashoka (3rd century BCE). Later caves (1st century BCE ~ ).

Buddhist caves in India are rock-cut religious structures that served primarily as monasteries and places of worship. They form an important part of Indian rock-cut architecture and preserve evidence of the development of Buddhist religious practices, architecture and art. There are more than 1,500 known rock cut structures in India, out of which about 1000 were made by Buddhists (mainly between 200 BCE and 600 CE), 300 by Hindus (from 600 CE to 1200 CE), and 200 by Jains (from 800 CE to 1200 CE). Many of these structures contain works of art of global importance, and many later caves from the Mahayana period are adorned with exquisite stone carvings. These ancient and medieval structures represent significant achievements of structural engineering and craftsmanship.

Natural caves and rock-cut sanctuaries have served religious purposes in several Indian traditions. Rock-cut architecture also allowed builders to create enclosed worship spaces within existing rock formations.

The Barabar caves in Bihar, dating to the 3rd century BCE, are among the earliest surviving examples of rock-cut architecture in India. Of these caves, mostly built by Emperor Ashoka and his grandson Dasaratha for the ascetic sect of the Ajivikas, two caves are thought to have been dedicated to the Buddhists: Karan Chaupar cave, and possibly the Lomas Rishi cave. Most other Buddhist caves are then found in the western Deccan, consisting of shrines and monasteries, dating between 100 BCE and 170 CE. Historically, rock-cut temples have retained a wood-like theme in adornment; skilled craftsmen learned to mimic the textures of timber, grain, and structure. The earliest cave temples include the Bhaja Caves, the Karla Caves, the Bedse Caves, the Kanheri Caves, and some of the Ajanta Caves. Relics found in these caves suggest a connection between the religious and the commercial, as Buddhist missionaries often accompanied traders on the busy international trading routes through India. Some of the more sumptuous cave temples, commissioned by wealthy traders, included pillars, arches, and elaborate facades during the time maritime trade boomed between the Roman Empire and south-east Asia.

Rock-cut Buddhist architecture developed alongside the construction of free-standing religious buildings. The Ajanta Caves illustrate a later phase of Buddhist cave construction, with monuments produced during distinct periods of activity. The chronology and development of Buddhist cave architecture varied across regions.

== Architecture ==
Buddhist cave architecture primarily features chaitya halls and viharas. Chaitya halls were designed primarily for worship and typically consisted of an elongated interior divided into a central passage and two side aisles by rows of pillars. These passages extended around a stupa at the far end, allowing worshippers to circumambulate it. The halls often featured an apsidal layout, with the stupa positioned at the curved end. Viharas, in contrast, served as residential spaces for Buddhist monks. Their layouts generally consisted of a central courtyard or hall surrounded by individual cells, which provided living quarters for the monks and allowed them to gather within the monastery.

Early Buddhist caves also retained features associated with traditional wooden architecture. These included wooden porches at the entrances and wooden support beams within their interiors, reflecting the influence of earlier wooden construction methods on the development of rock-cut architecture.

== Early natural caves ==
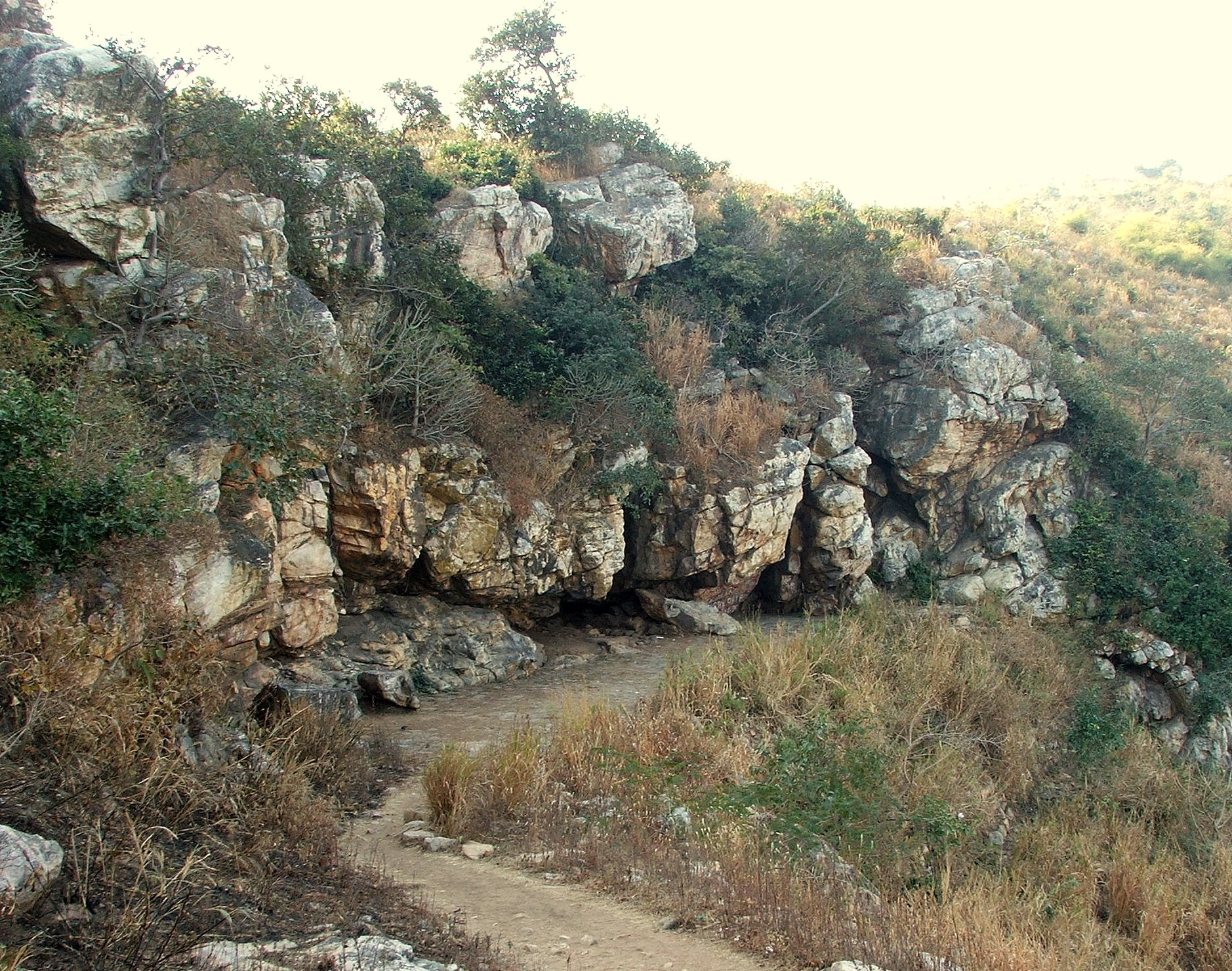
Saptaparni Cave, a retreat of the Buddha

Natural caves were among the earliest places used by humans for shelter and religious activities. Evidence suggests that caves were occupied and occasionally modified during the Palaeolithic and Mesolithic periods, up to approximately 6000 BCE, although these modifications did not generally constitute architectural construction. Early examples of human modifications include rock shelters featuring engraved designs and other forms of rock-cut designs. The Rock Shelters of Bhimbetka, a World Heritage Site, are situated along the edge of the Deccan Plateau, where erosion has exposed extensive sandstone formations. The area's caves and grottos have yielded primitive tools and decorative rock paintings.

During the lifetime of the Buddha (c. 563/480 or c. 483/400 BCE), Buddhist monks also used natural caves as places of residence and meditation. One example is the Saptaparni Cave, located southwest from Rajgir, Bihar. The cave is traditionally associated with the Buddha's final years and where the first Buddhist council was held after the Buddha died (paranirvana). The Buddha is also associated with the Indrasala Cave, where he is said to have meditated. The use of natural caves as places of religious retreat subsequently continued alongside the development of purpose-built rock-cut monasteries and sanctuaries.

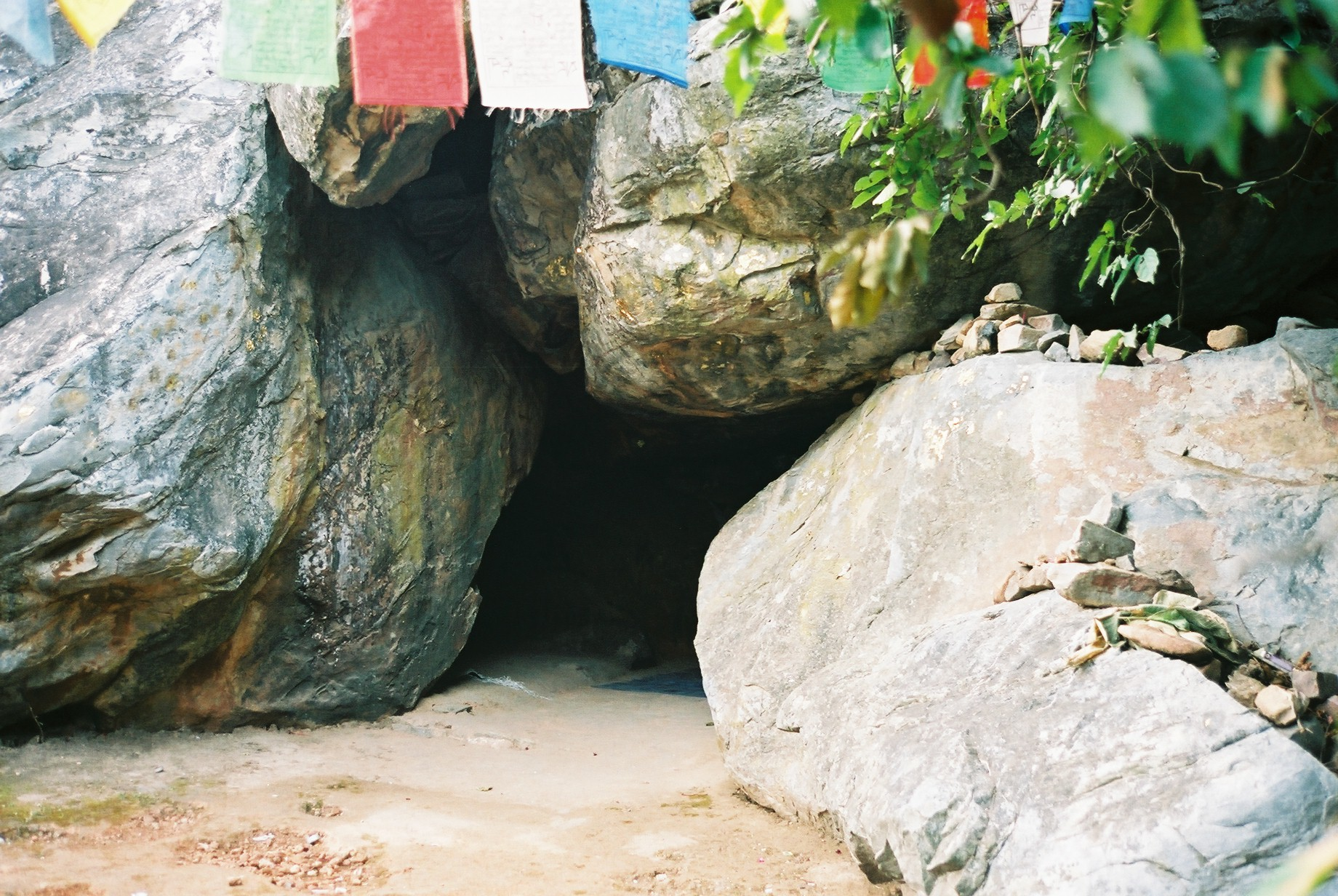
A natural cave for meditation in Vulture Peak, one of the favourite abodes of the Buddha

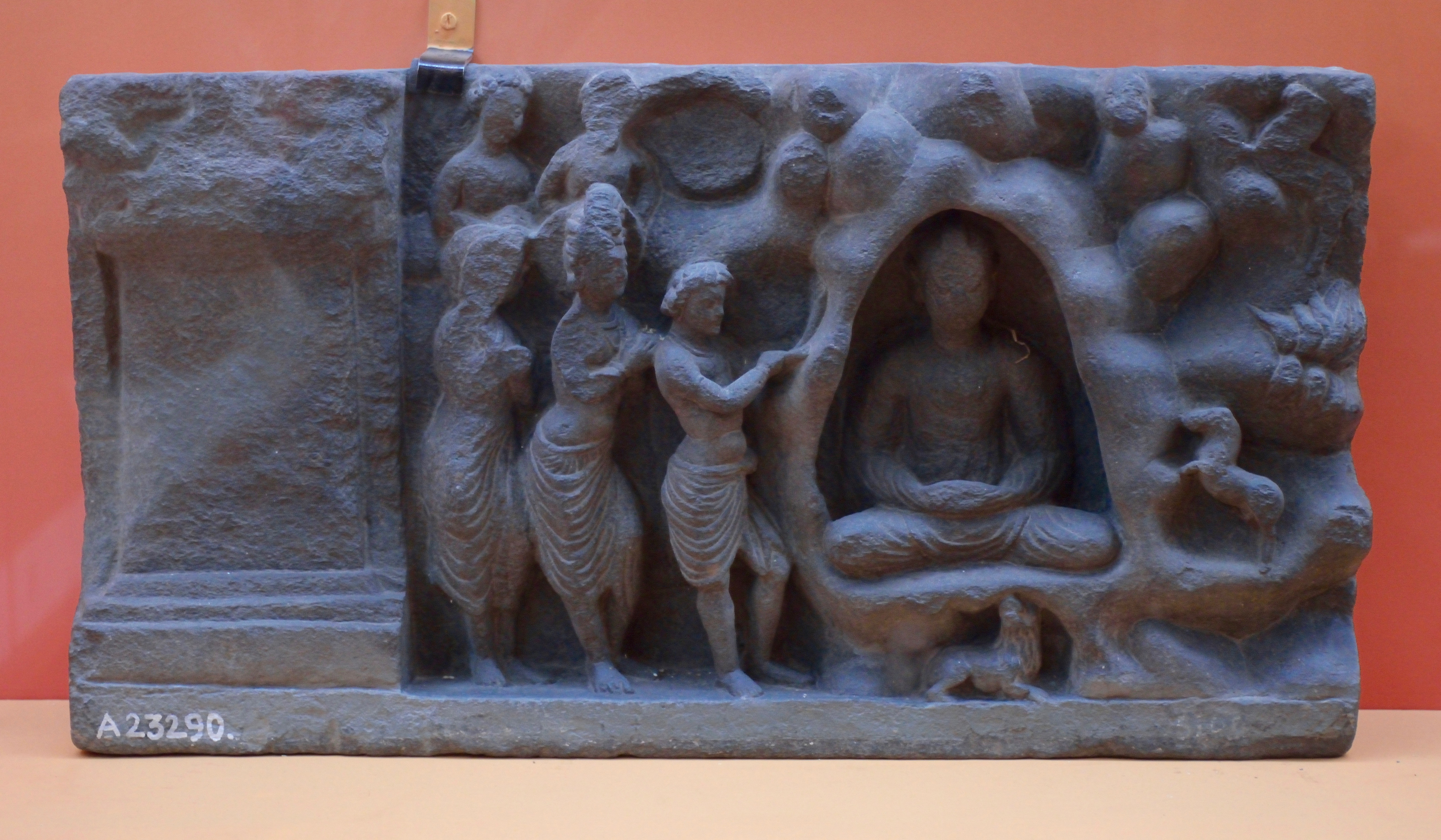
The Buddha meditating in the Indrasala Cave. 2nd-century CE relief from Loriyan Tangai, Gandhara

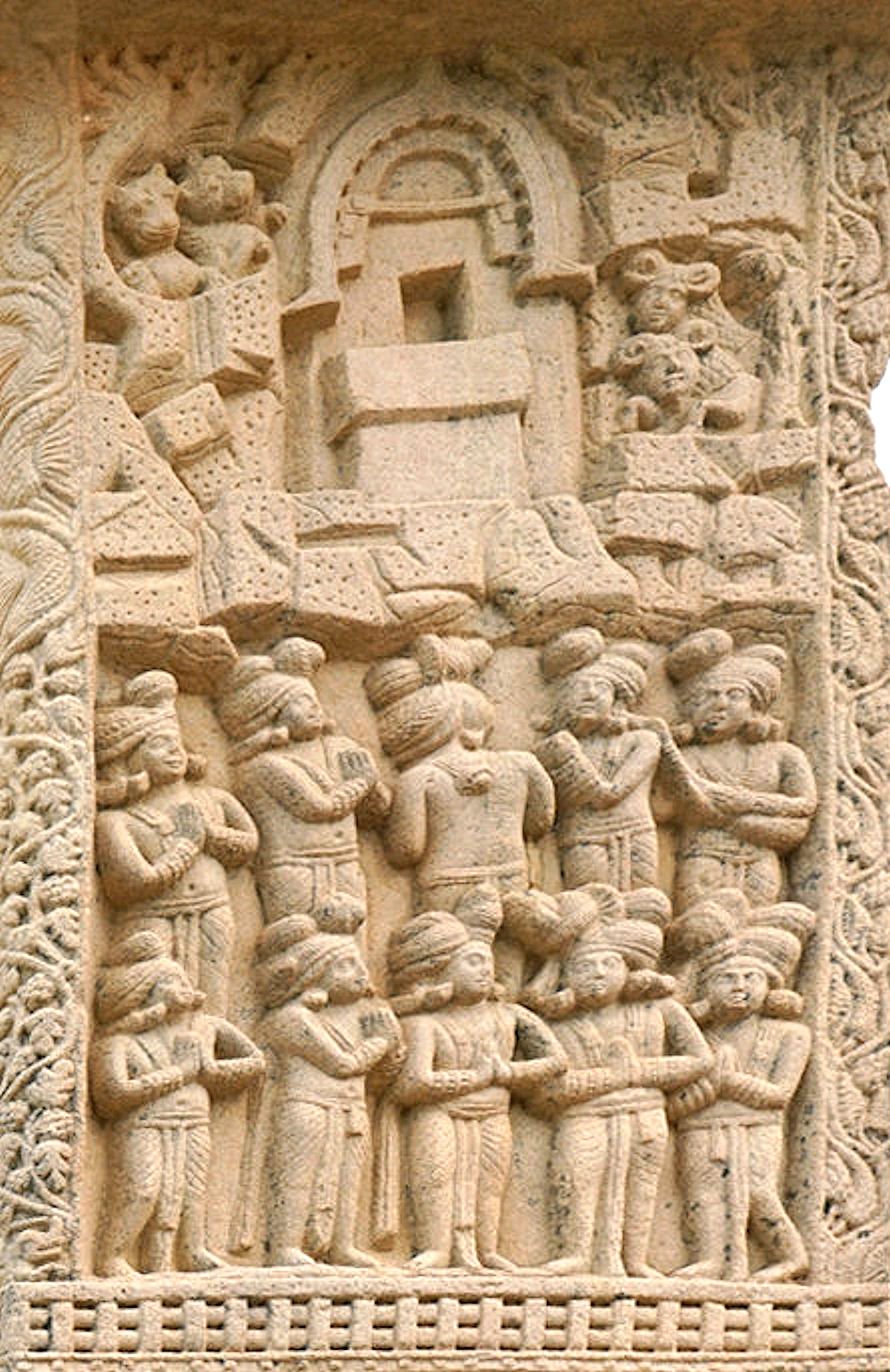
The Visit of Indra to the Buddha in the Indrasaila cave. The Buddha is symbolized by his throne. Wild animal are depicted around the cave (Stupa 1 Northern Gateway, Sanchi. 1st century BCE/CE)

=== Saru Maru transition ===
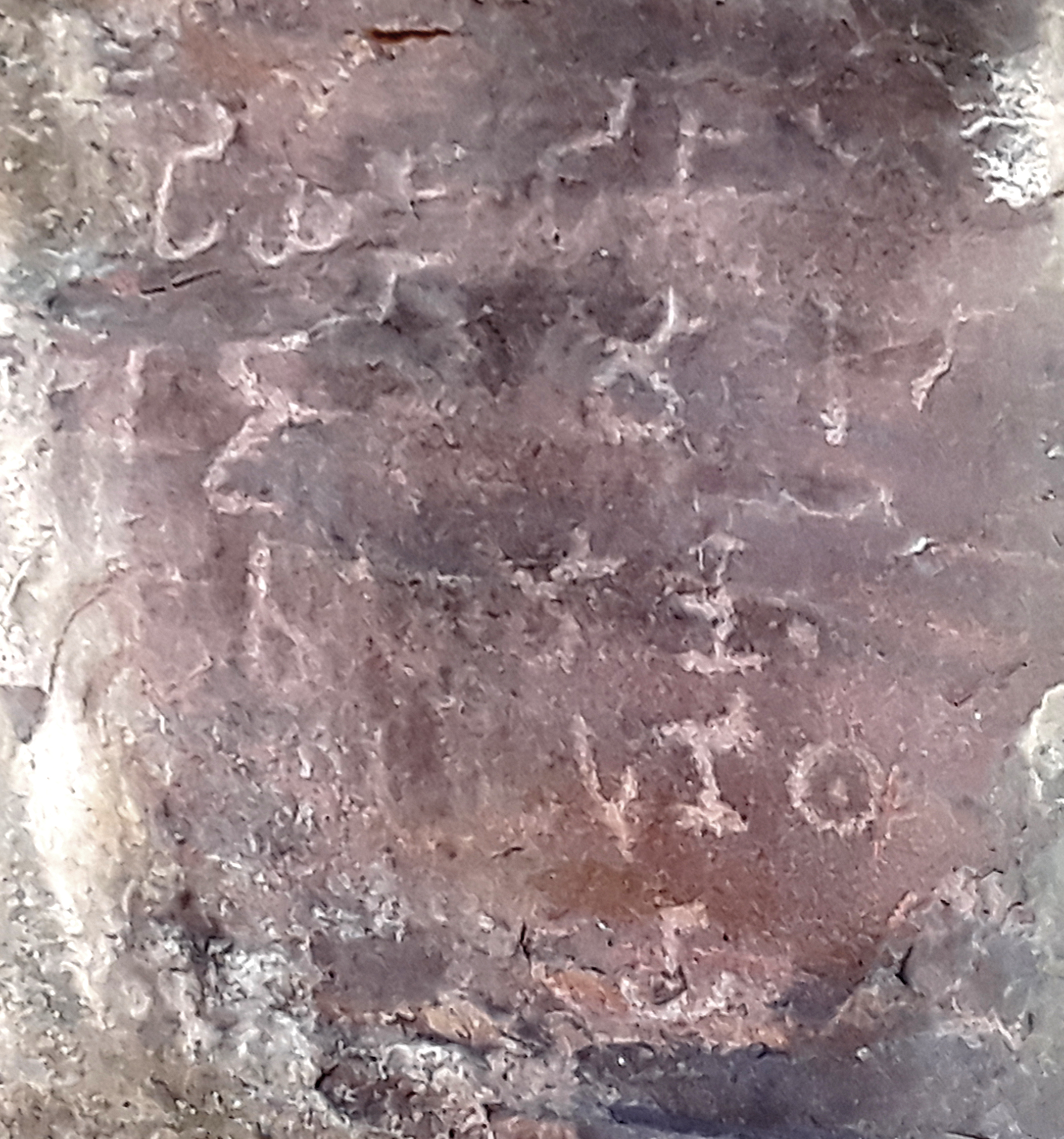
The commemorative inscription of Ashoka as a prince in the natural cave of Saru Maru

Natural caves continued to be used for a long time across a wide area, as demonstrated by the Saru Maru caves (also known as the Pangoraria or Budhani caves) in Madhya Pradesh. More than 45 rock shelters have been identified in the Pangoraria area, a Buddhist site containing several stupas and dwellings. Ashoka visited the area as a young prince while serving as governor, based in Vidisha, as recorded in a commemorative inscription in one of the two natural caves. He later also left his Minor Rock Edict in the second cave at Saru Maru.

According to Gupta, the Saru Maru caves also feature some human-made modifications, such as rock-cut steps and benches for monks.These modifications may represent an early stage in the development of artificial caves, such as those at Barabar, under Ashoka. The Saru Maru caves may therefore represent an intermediate stage between the use of natural caves for Buddhist purposes and the construction of fully artificial rock-cut caves, such as those at Barabar around 250 BCE.

Alternatively, it has been suggested that the construction techniques used at Barabar, particularly its highly polished surfaces, may have been influenced by Achaemenid stone-working traditions. According to this theory, these techniques were introduced to India following the fall of the Achaemenid Empire to Alexander the Great in 330 BCE, possibly through the arrival of Persian and Perso-Greek artisans and craftsmen.

== Artificial caves of Eastern India (3rd-2nd centuries BCE) ==
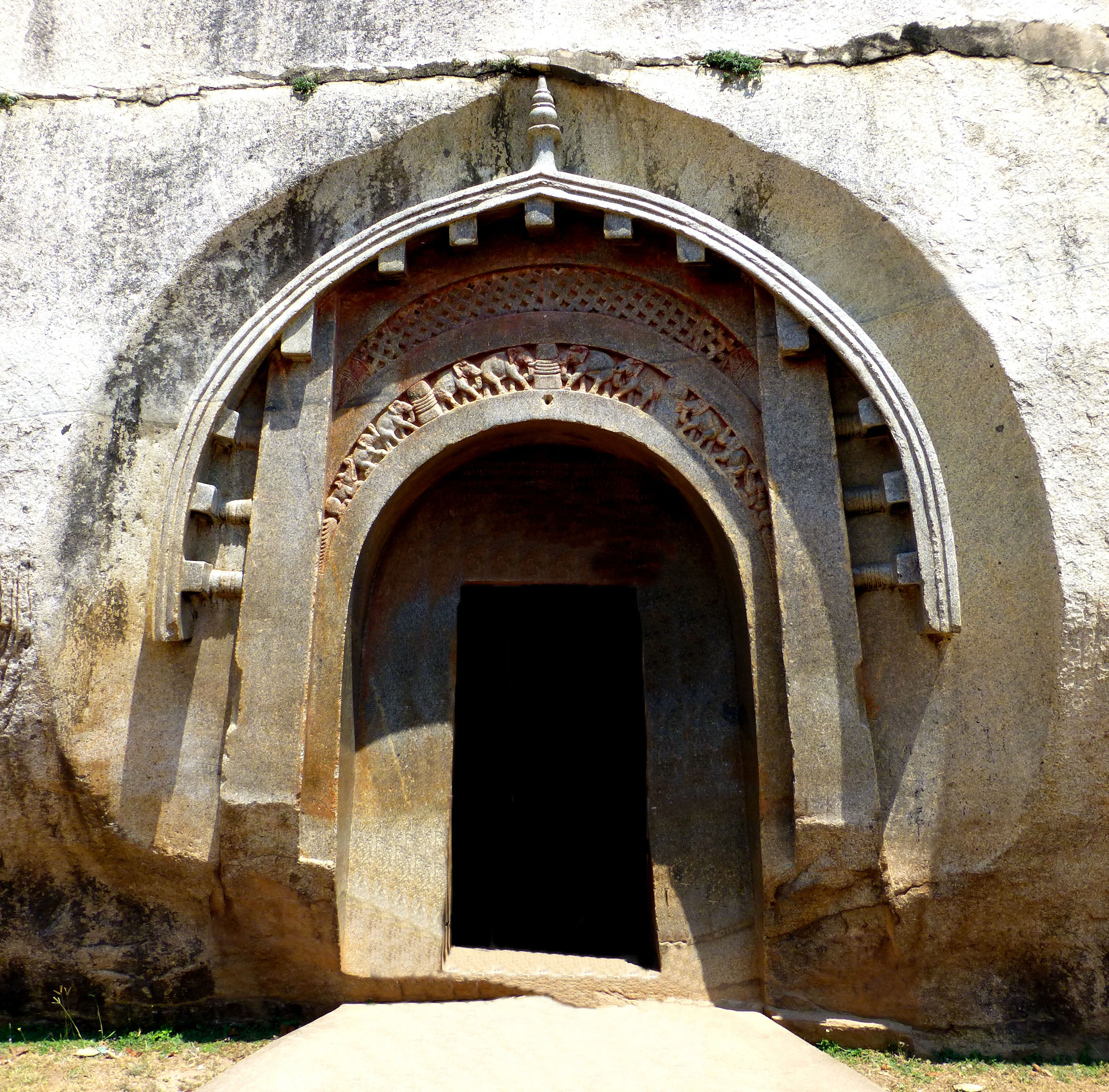
The famous carved door of Lomas Rishi, one of the Barabar Caves, dated to approximately 250 BCE, displaying the first known Maurya reliefs.

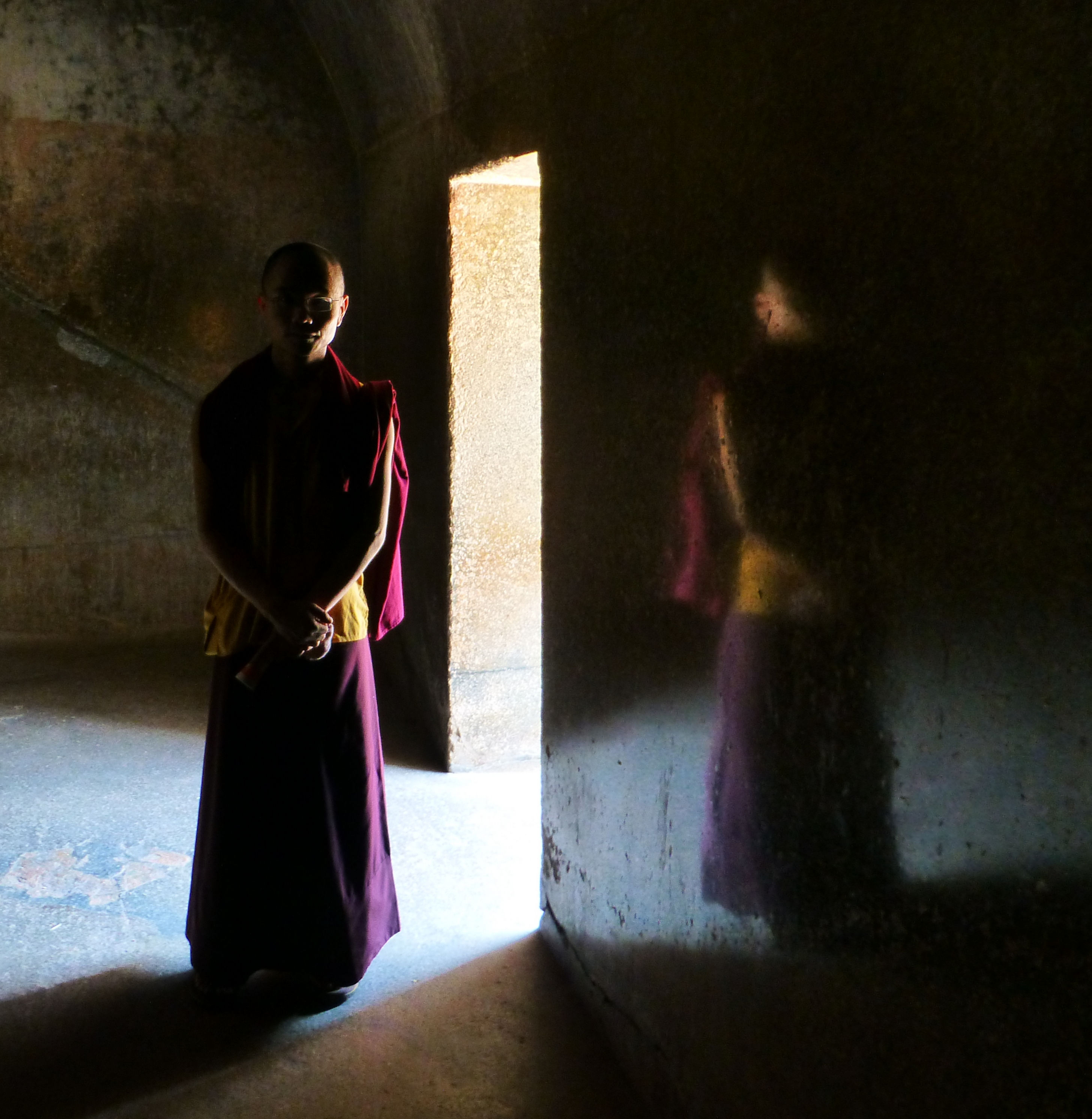
The quasi-perfect walls of the Barabar Caves were dug into the hard rock and polished to a mirror effect circa 250 BCE, date of the inscriptions of Ashoka.

In the 3rd century BCE, Indian rock-cut architecture began to develop, starting with the already highly sophisticated and state-sponsored Barabar caves in Bihar, which were personally dedicated by Ashoka to the ascetic sect of the Ajivikas around 250 BCE. The precise identity of the Ajivikas is not well known, and it is unclear whether they were a distinct sect from the Buddhists or the Jains. These artificial caves demonstrate a high level of technical proficiency, with the extremely hard granite rock cut into geometric shapes and polished to a mirror-like finish.

Another cave with a similar structure and polished surfaces to those of the Barabar caves is the Sitamarhi Cave, which has no inscriptions. Located 20 km from Rajgir and 10 km south-west of Hisua, it is also dated to the Maurya Empire. It is smaller than the Barabar caves, measuring only 4.91 x 3.43 m, with a ceiling height of 2.01 m. Its entrance is also trapezoidal, like those of the Barabar caves.

The caves were carved out of granite, an extremely hard rock, and their inner surfaces were then polished to produce a highly regular, mirror-like finish. This polishing also creates an echo effect. This large-scale polishing technique is reminiscent of the smaller polished surfaces found on Mauryan statuary, particularly the pillars and capitals of the Ashoka pillars.

Commenting on Mauryan sculpture, John Marshall once wrote about the "extraordinary precision and accuracy which characterizes all Mauryan works, and which has never, we venture to say, been surpassed even by the finest workmanship on Athenian buildings".

This level of polishing appears to have disappeared after the Maurya period, as later caves, such as the Ajanta caves, do not exhibit the same characteristic polished surfaces. The practice of excavating artificial caves directly into rock, of which the Barabar caves are considered the earliest Indian examples, may have been influenced by the rock-cut tombs of the Achaemenids, such as those at Naqsh-e Rostam.

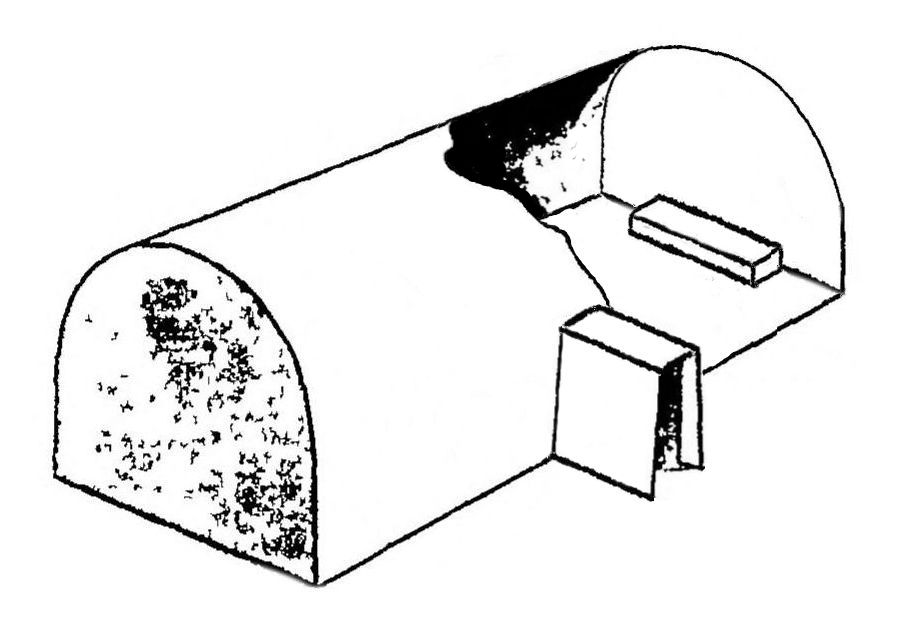
Karan Chaupar, volume plan (10.2x4.27m)

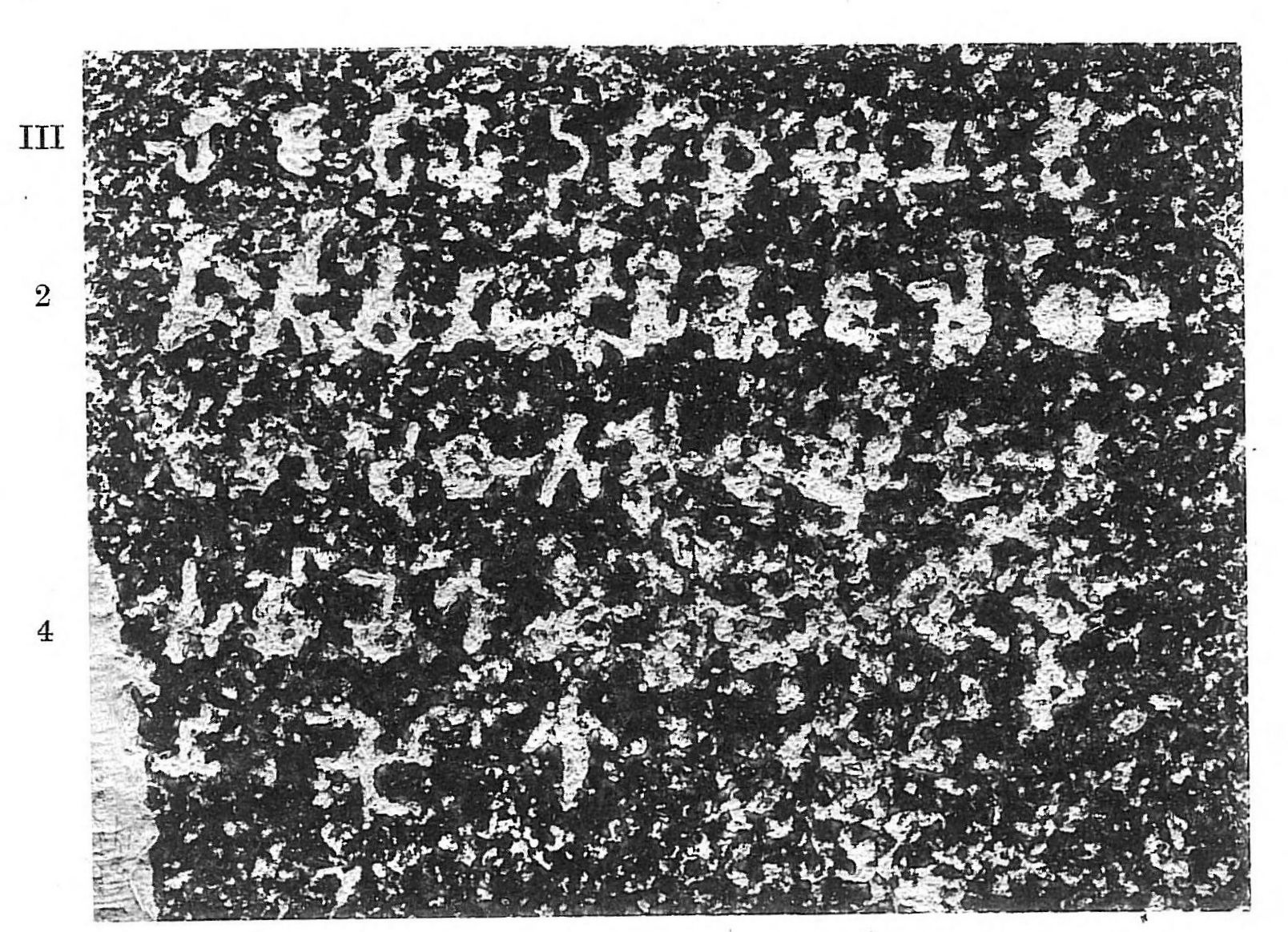
Dedicatory inscription by Ashoka to the Ajivikas, in Karan Chaupar, Barabar caves.

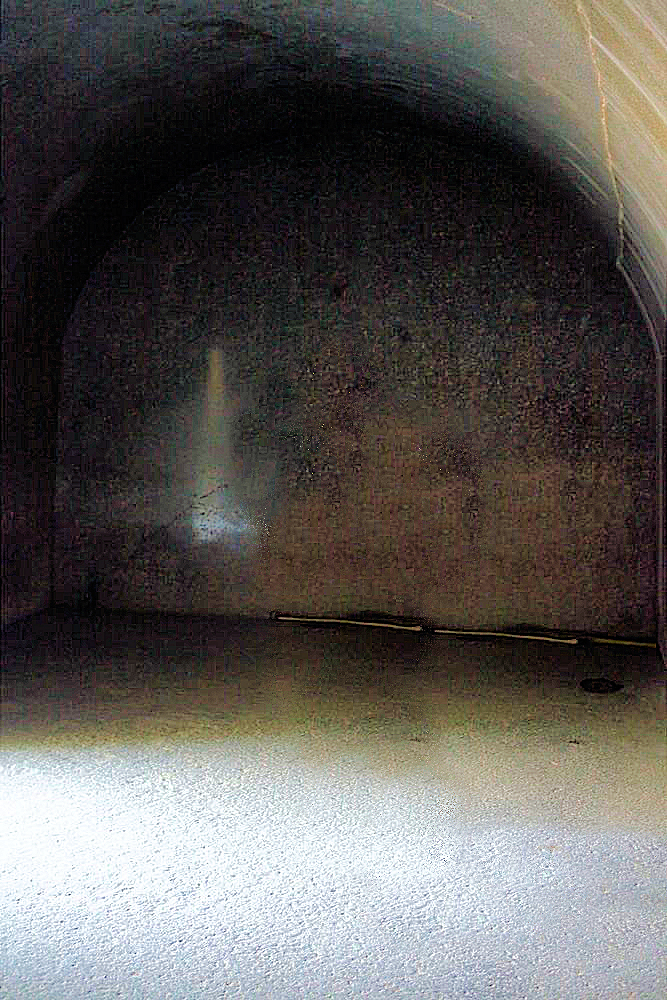
Polished interior of Karan Chaupar

=== Imperial sponsorship ===
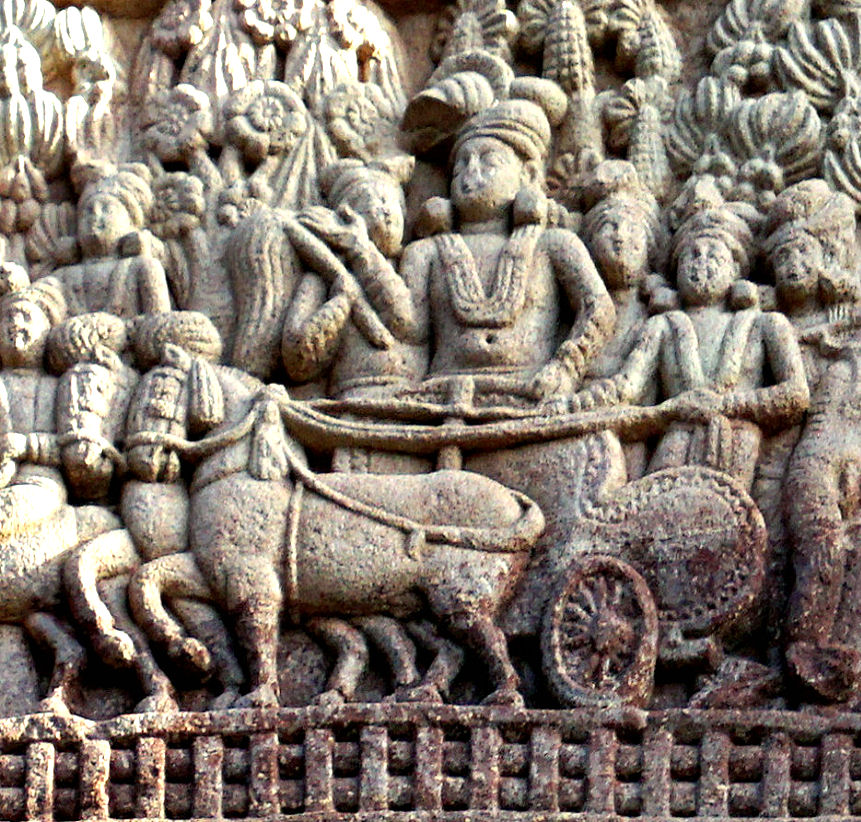
The Barabar caves were sponsored by the emperor, as revealed by their dedicatory inscriptions.

These remarkable caves were commissioned under the imperial patronage of Ashoka and his grandson Dasaratha Maurya. The cost of the rock-cutting and polishing work was probably considerable, and similar levels of craftsmanship were not replicated in later caves. Ashoka dedicated the caves of Sudama and Visvakarma to the Ajivikas in the 12th year of his reign, before his religious transition towards Buddhism was fully completed. Later, Ashoka commissioned the caves of Lomas Rishi (which has no dated inscription but is considered later than Sudama on architectural grounds) and Karna Chopar (in the 19th year of his reign), by which time he had become a firm advocate of Buddhism, as indicated by the Edicts of Ashoka. It has therefore been suggested that he may have dedicated the latter two caves, Lomas Rishi and Karna Chopar, to Buddhists. However, Lomas Rishi has no inscription, while the inscription at Karna Chopar only indirectly suggests a Buddhist affiliation. Ashoka's inscription in Karna Chopar Cave does not mention the Ajivikas and appears instead to refer to the Buddhist practice of monastic retreat during the rainy season (vassavasa). In addition, the inverted swastika with an upward-pointing arrow at the end of the inscription has been interpreted as a Buddhist symbol. It has therefore been suggested that the cave was intended for Buddhist monks.

The possible Buddhist affiliation of the last two caves is consistent with the influence of the architecture of the Lomas Rishi entrance on the development of the Chaitya arch in Buddhist cave architecture over the following centuries. Hindu and Jain caves generally did not adopt this architectural feature. This would also suggest that the decorated entrance of Lomas Rishi was a Buddhist architectural innovation that was later adopted in Buddhist cave architecture.

== Artificial caves of Western India ==
After the Barabar caves, some of the earliest known rock-cut Buddhist monasteries appeared in the Western Ghats of western India during the 1st century BCE. The construction of religious caves continued across western India until the 6th century CE. However, the highly polished interiors characteristic of the Barabar caves were not replicated in later examples. Even prominent sites such as the Karla Caves (1st century CE) and the Ajanta Caves (5th century CE) lack this feature. This may be because the Mauryan caves were dedicated and sponsored by the imperial government, which could provide substantial resources for their construction, whereas later caves were largely funded through donations from individuals who may not have had access to comparable resources.

=== First wave of construction (2nd century BCE- 2nd century CE) ===
Following the fall of the Mauryan Empire in the 2nd century BCE, Buddhist cave construction increasingly developed in western India. One proposed explanation is that the persecution of Buddhists under Pushyamitra Sunga led many Buddhists to relocate to the Deccan, where they received protection under the Andhra dynasty. Religious cave construction, particularly for Buddhist and Jain communities, continued on a large scale until the 2nd century CE, culminating in sites such as the Karla Caves and the Pandavleni Caves. These caves generally followed an apsidal plan, with a stupa at the rear of chaitya halls, or a rectangular layout with surrounding cells in viharas.

When Buddhist missionaries arrived, they naturally gravitated to caves for use as temples and abodes, in accord with their religious ideas of asceticism and the monastic life. The Western Ghats topography, with its flat-topped basalt hills, deep ravines, and sharp cliffs, was suited to their cultural inclinations.

==== First western artificial vihara caves (100-70 BCE) ====
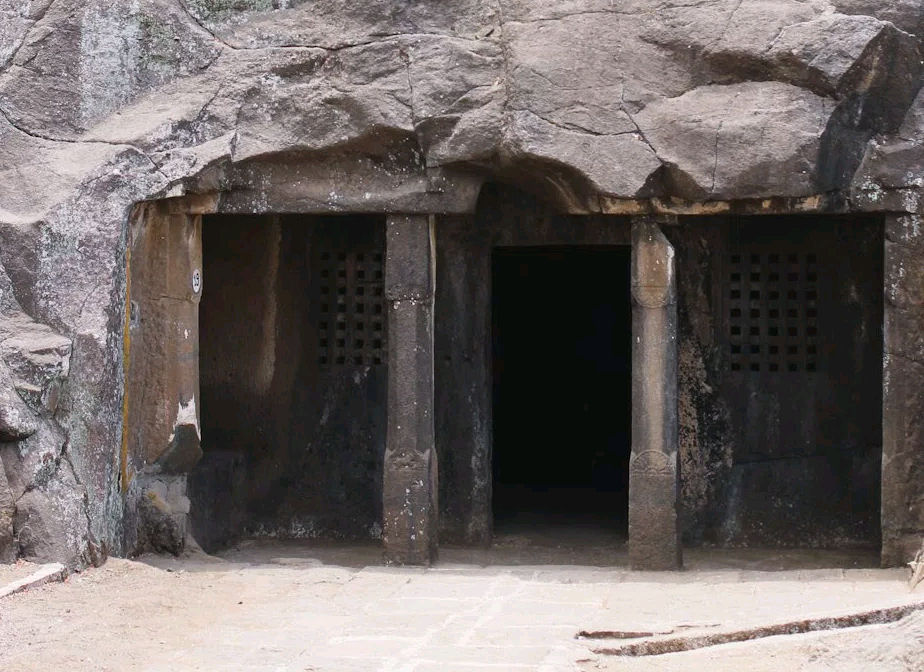
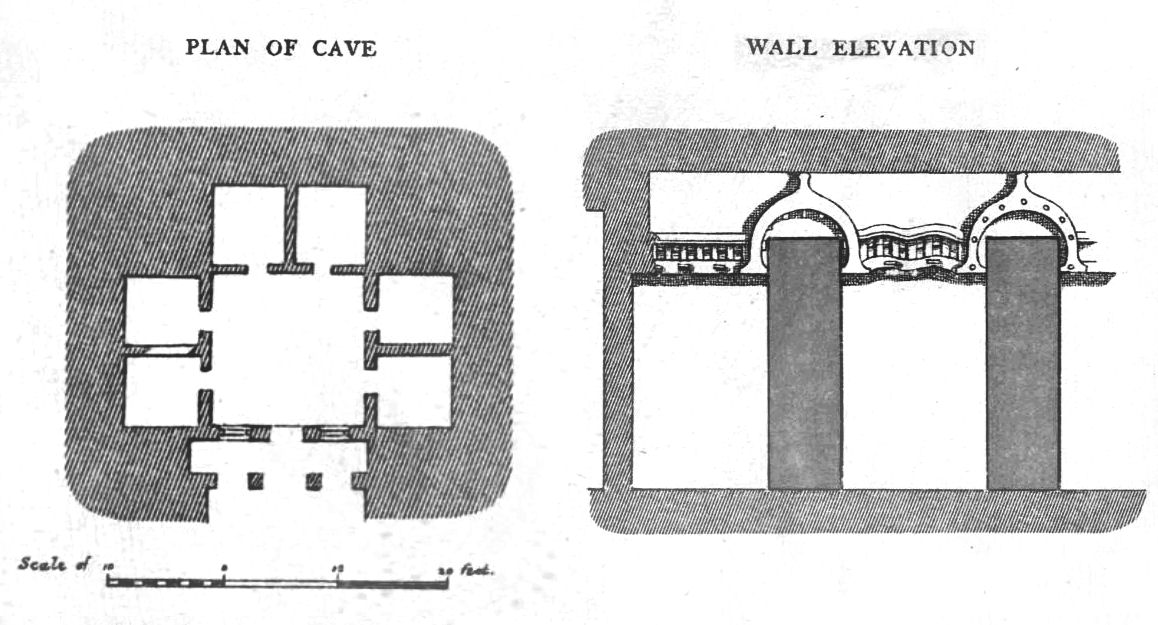
Cave No.19 of the Nasik Caves, an early vihara dated to 100-70 BCE.

Several simple viharas were excavated into the rock during this period, including Cave 19 of the Nasik Caves. This small vihara measures 14 feet 3 inches square and contains six cells, with two along each side. The cell entrances are topped by chaitya-arch ornaments, connected in places by a frieze featuring a "rail pattern". The front wall contains two lattice windows, while the veranda has two slender square pillars with chamfered, octagonal sections along their shafts. The cave is relatively plain in style, with a distinctly rectangular layout. Its architectural features have been compared to those of other early viharas, including Cave 12 at Ajanta, as well as caves at Bhaja and Kondane. These similarities suggest that they may belong to a similar period. The earliest caves at the Kanheri Caves were also excavated during the 1st and 2nd centuries BCE. At Ajanta, Buddhist monks occupied the caves continuously from 200 BCE to 650 CE. As Buddhist monasteries were associated with trade networks, they often served as stopping points and provided accommodation for merchants travelling along trade routes.

Cave No. 19 at the Nasik Caves contains an inscription of Krishna, a king of the Satavahanas. Dated to 100–70 BCE, it is considered the oldest known Satavahana inscription.

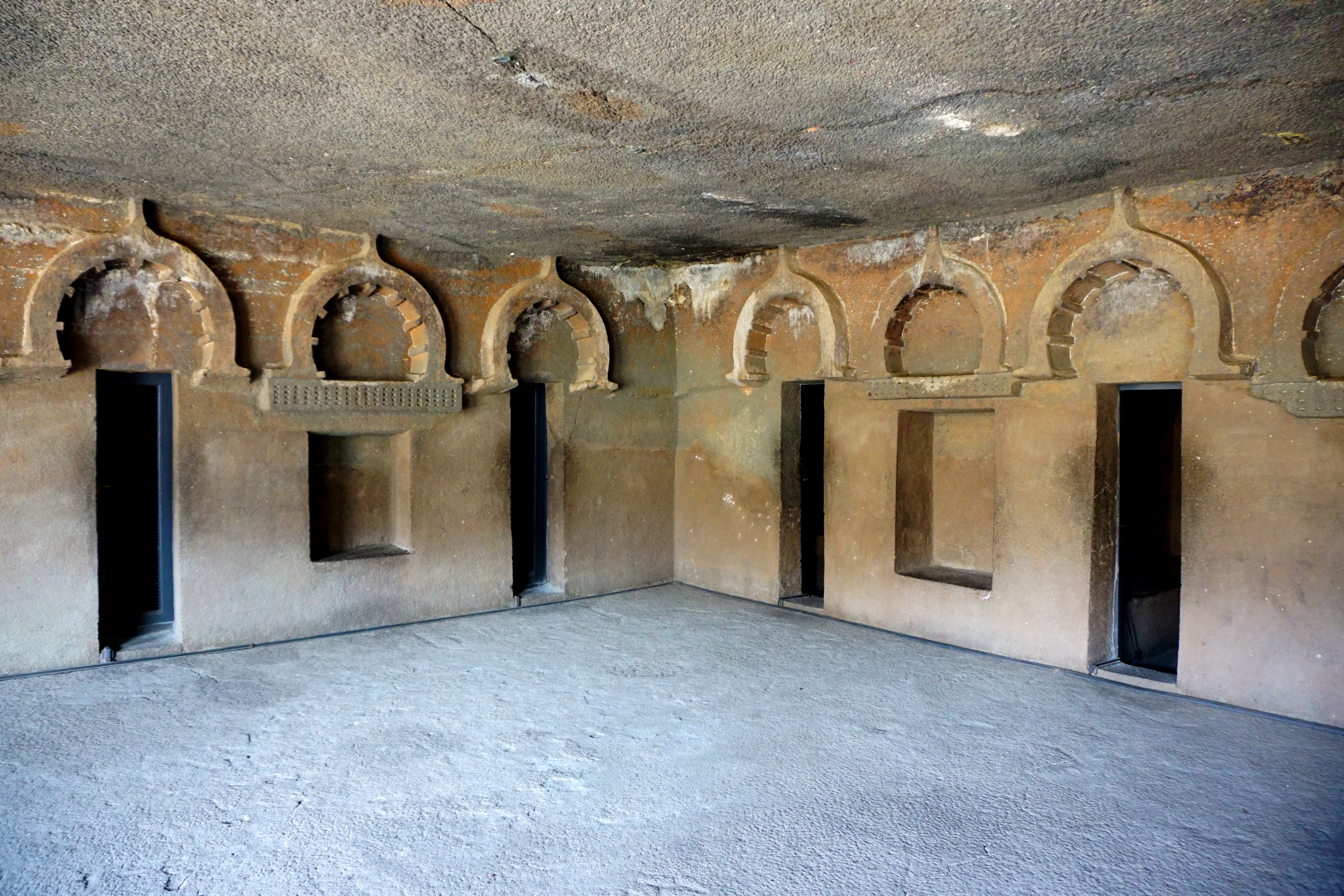
Cave 12 in Ajanta, another early vihara with monk cells.

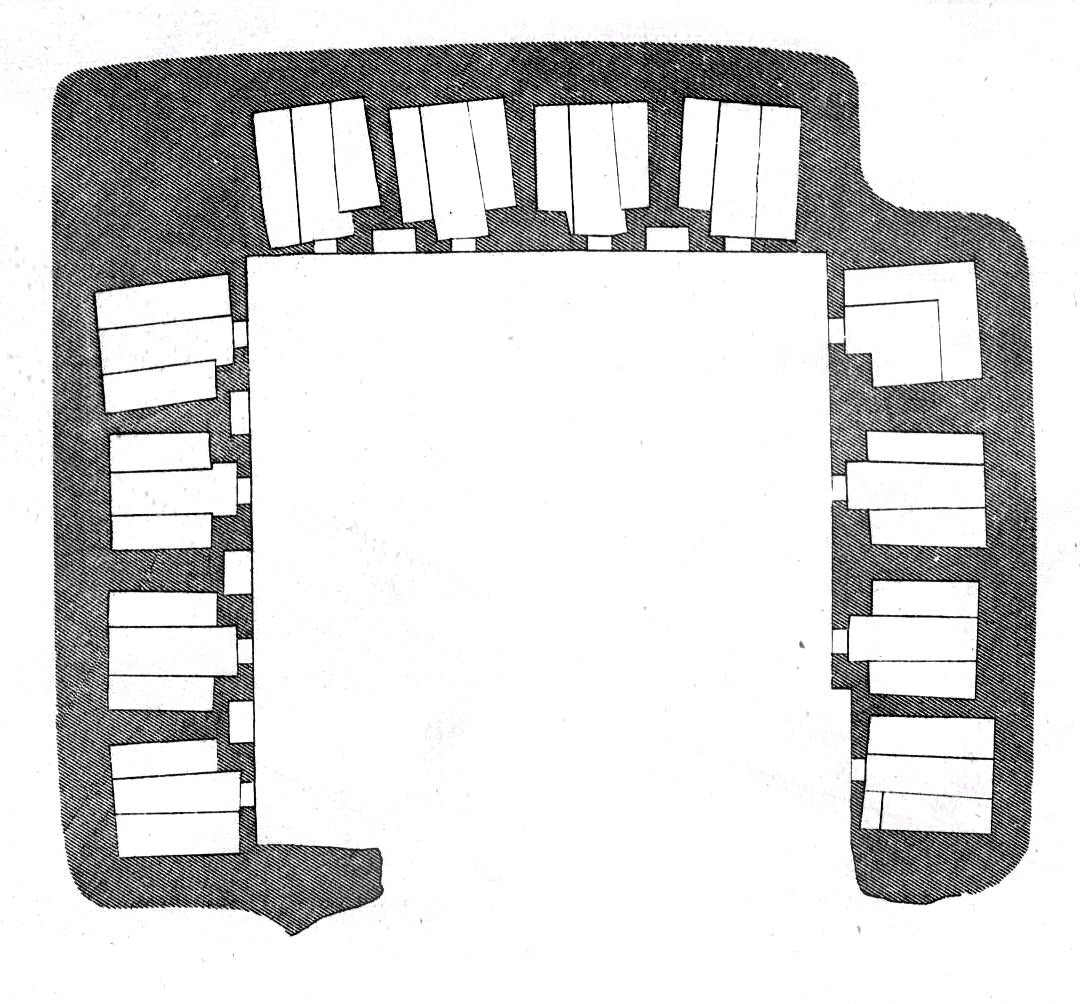
Plan of Cave 12 in Ajanta. Each cell has two stone beds.

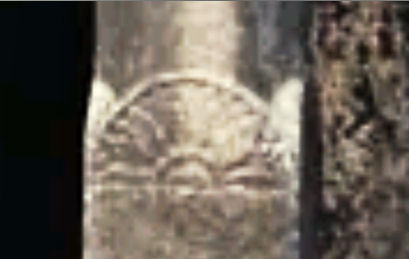
A halk-flower medallions design on a pillar of Cave No.19, typical of early designs such as those of Sanchi.

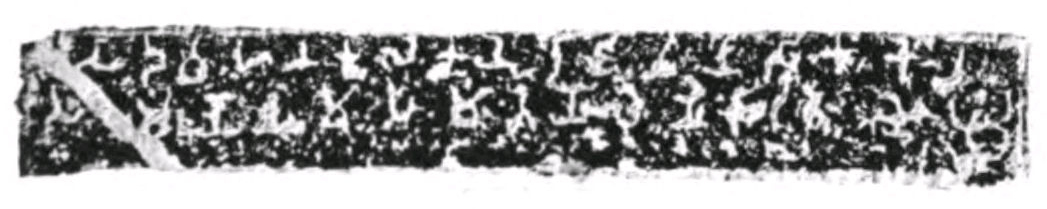
Kanha inscription of cave No.19 (located on the upper sill of the right window).

==== Rock-cut chaitya halls ====
Facades were added to cave entrances, while the interiors were increasingly designed for specific purposes, such as monastic residences (viharas) and worship halls (chaityas). Over time, these excavated spaces became increasingly elaborate, resembling free-standing buildings in their architectural design. Their construction required skilled artisans and craftsmen, who adapted features of traditional wooden architecture to stone, including imitations of wooden structures and wood grain.

The earliest rock-cut chaitya halls, modelled after free-standing structures, consisted of an inner circular chamber surrounded by pillars, creating a passage around the stupa, and an outer rectangular hall for congregational worship. Over time, the partition separating the stupa from the outer hall was removed, resulting in an apsidal hall with a colonnade surrounding the nave and stupa.

The chaitya at Bhaja Caves is perhaps the earliest surviving chaitya hall, constructed in the second century BCE. It consists of an apsidal hall with stupa. The columns slope inwards in the imitation of wooden columns that would have been structurally necessary to keep a roof up. The ceiling is barrel vaulted with ancient wooden ribs set into them. The walls are polished in the Mauryan style. It was faced by a substantial wooden facade, now entirely lost. A large horseshoe-shaped window, the chaitya-window, was set above the arched doorway and the whole portico-area was carved to imitate a multi-storeyed building with balconies and windows and sculptured men and women who observed the scene below. This created the appearance of an ancient Indian mansion. This, like a similar facade at the Bedse Caves is an early example of what James Fergusson noted in the nineteenth century: "Everywhere ... in India architectural decoration is made up of small models of large buildings".

==== Maturity ====
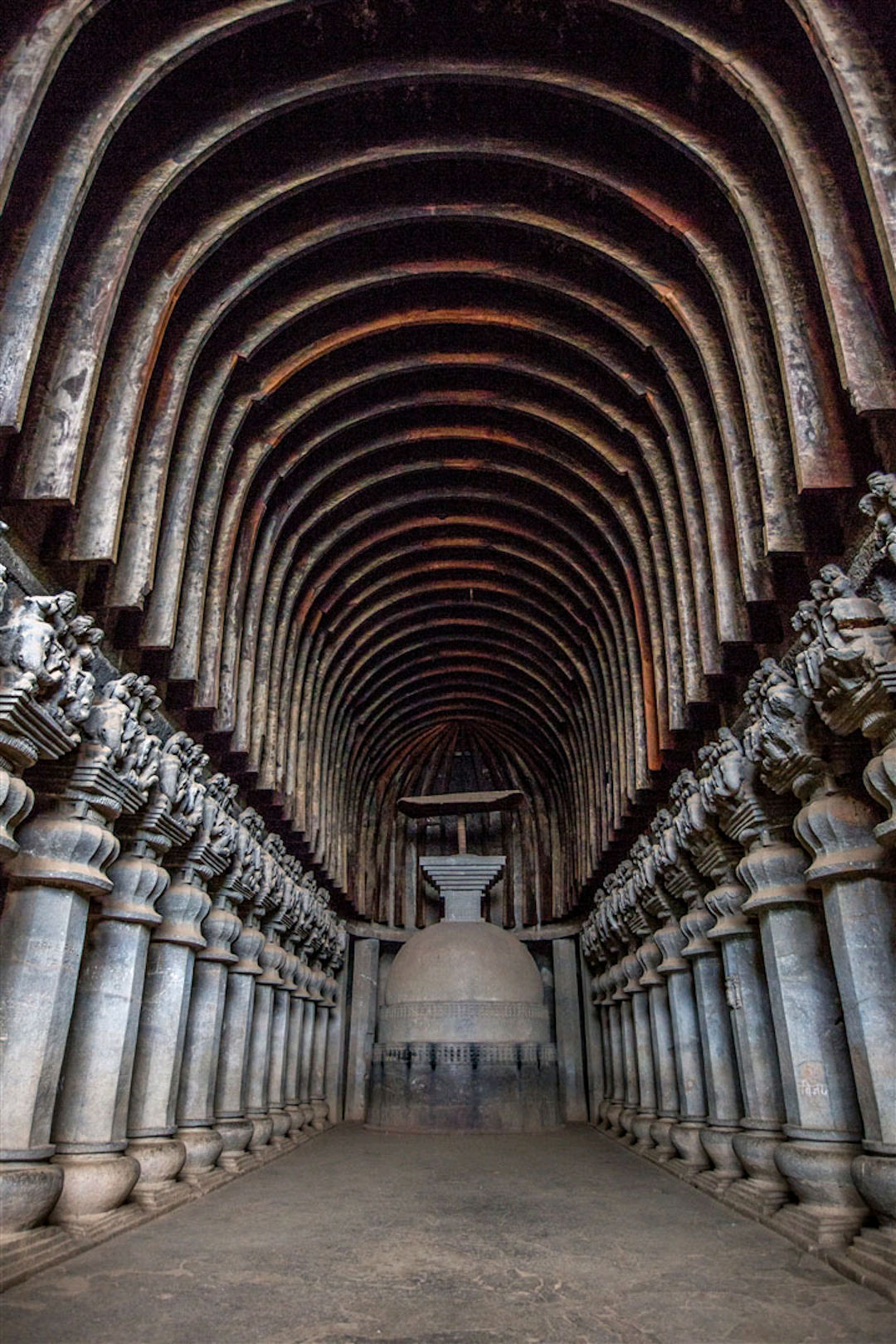
The Great Chaitya in the Karla Caves, Maharashtra, India, 1st century CE.

As mercantile and royal patronage increased, cave interiors became more elaborate, featuring paintings, reliefs and intricate carvings. Numerous individuals contributed to their construction and left dedicatory inscriptions. These donors included laypeople, members of the clergy, government officials and foreigners, such as the Yavanas (Greeks), who accounted for approximately 8% of the inscriptions. The Indo-Scythian rulers of the Western Satraps also sponsored the construction of numerous Buddhist caves, as evidenced by their dedications at sites such as the Karla Caves, Manmodi Caves and Nasik Caves. The Great Chaitya of the Karla Caves, the largest of its kind in South Asia, was constructed and dedicated in 120 CE under the patronage of Nahapana, a ruler of the Western Satraps. Following the recovery of territories previously held by the Western Satraps, the Satavahanas resumed their patronage of cave construction, as seen at the Nasik Caves and Kanheri Caves.

Although many temples, monasteries and stupas have been destroyed over time, cave temples have generally survived in better condition. Their locations made them less visible and potentially less vulnerable to vandalism, while their rock-cut construction made them more durable than structures built from wood and other materials. Approximately 1,200 cave temples remain in existence, most of which are Buddhist. These sites include monastic residences known as viharas and cave shrines known as chaityas, which were used for congregational worship. Among the architectural features of these caves was the early rock-cut garbhagriha, which resembled the layout of later free-standing structures. It consisted of an inner circular chamber surrounded by pillars, forming a circumambulatory passage (pradakshina) around the stupa, and an outer rectangular hall where devotees could gather.

== Gallery ==
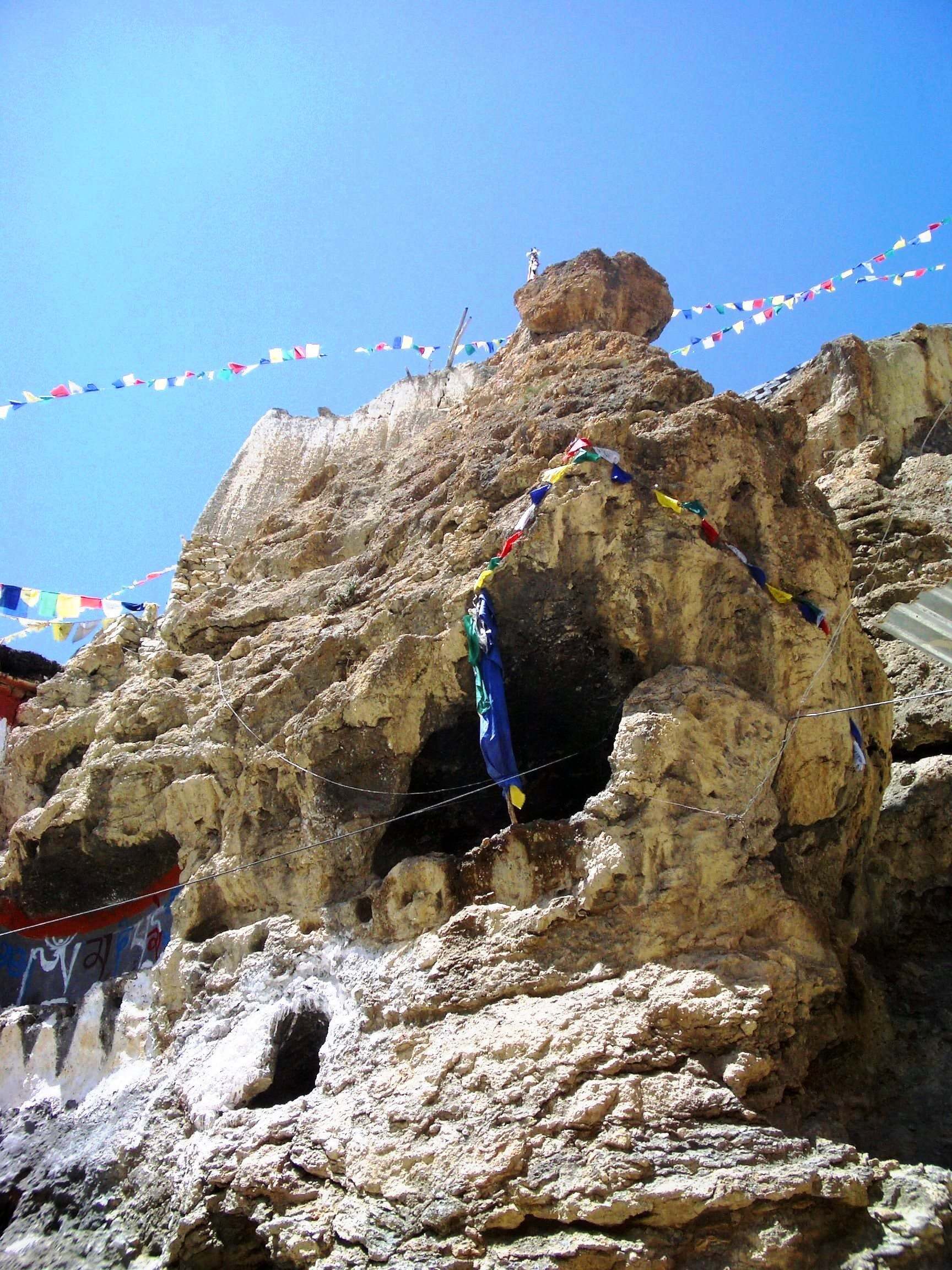
Meditation caves above Dhankar Gompa

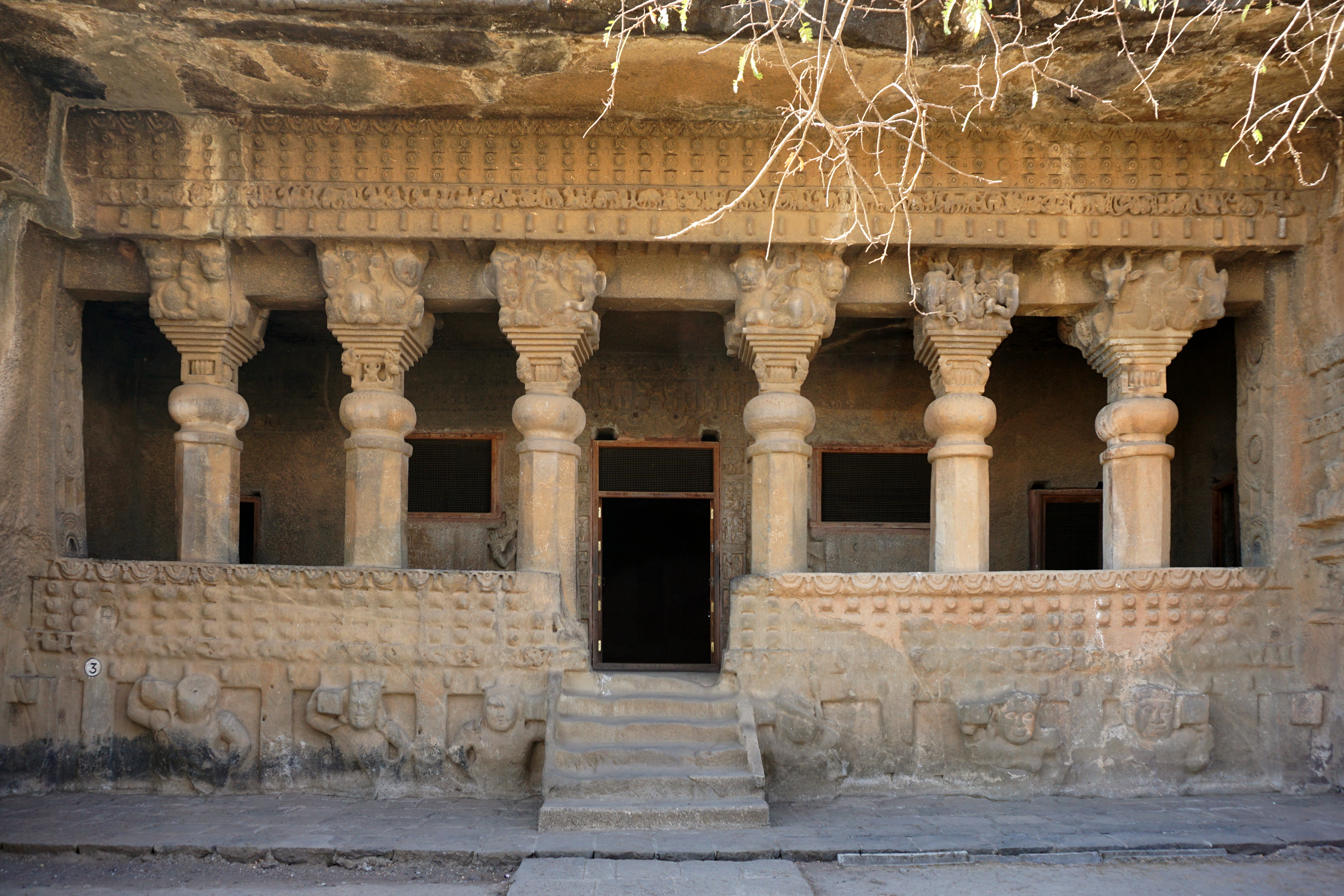
Gautamiputra vihara at Pandavleni Caves built in the 2nd century CE by the Satavahana dynasty

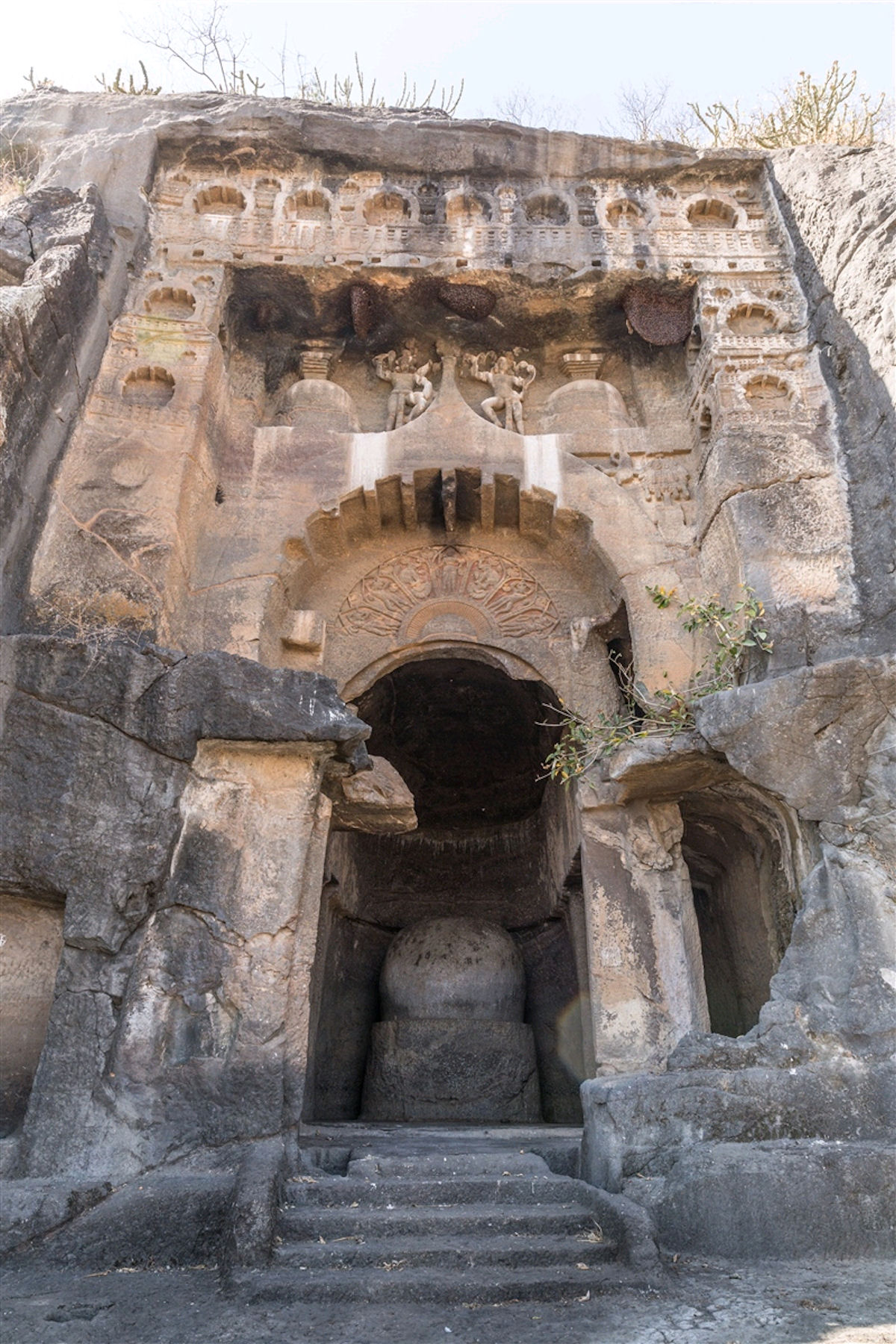
Manmodi Caves in Junnar, 2nd century CE

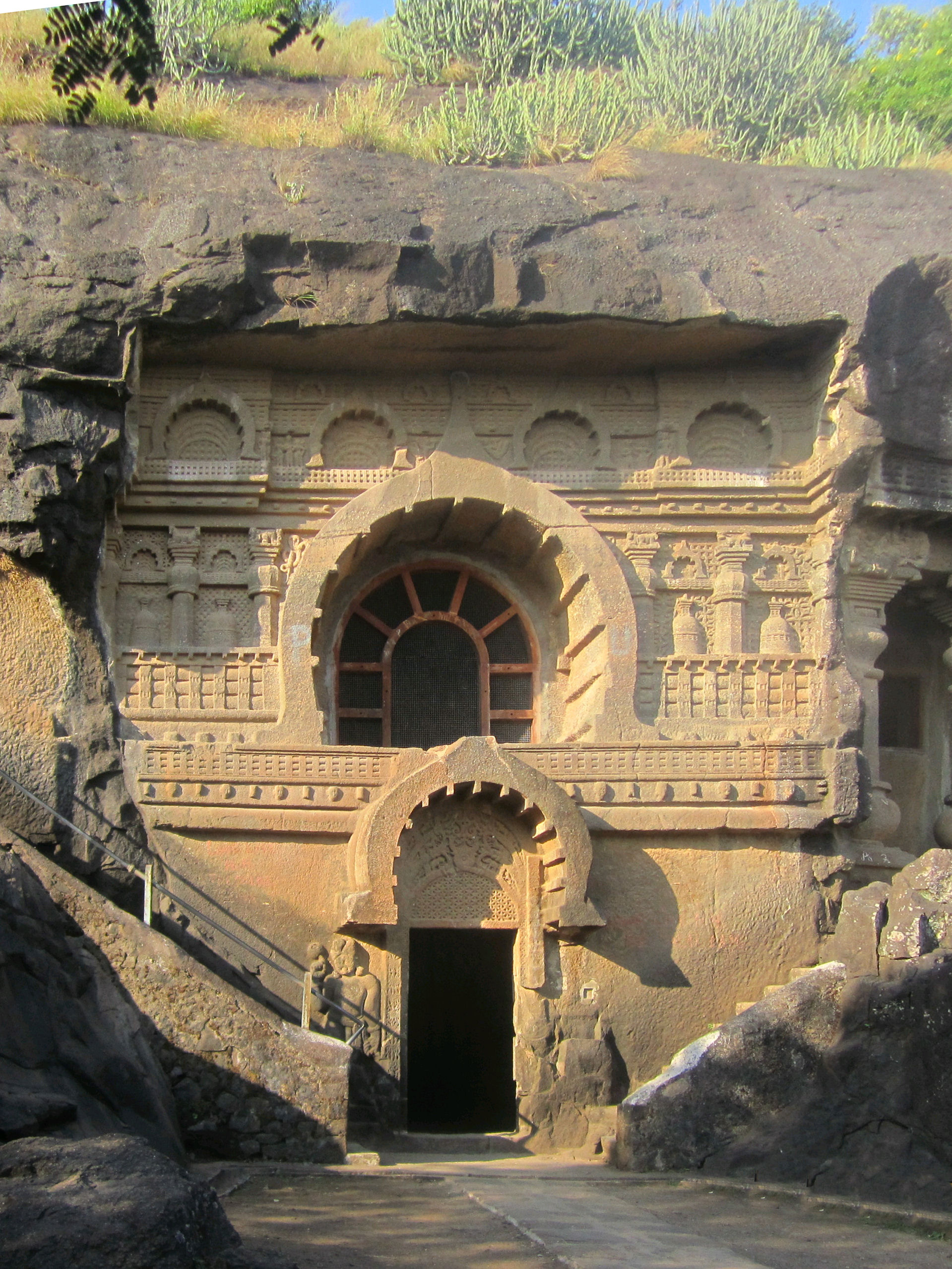
Chaitya facade at Pandavleni Caves

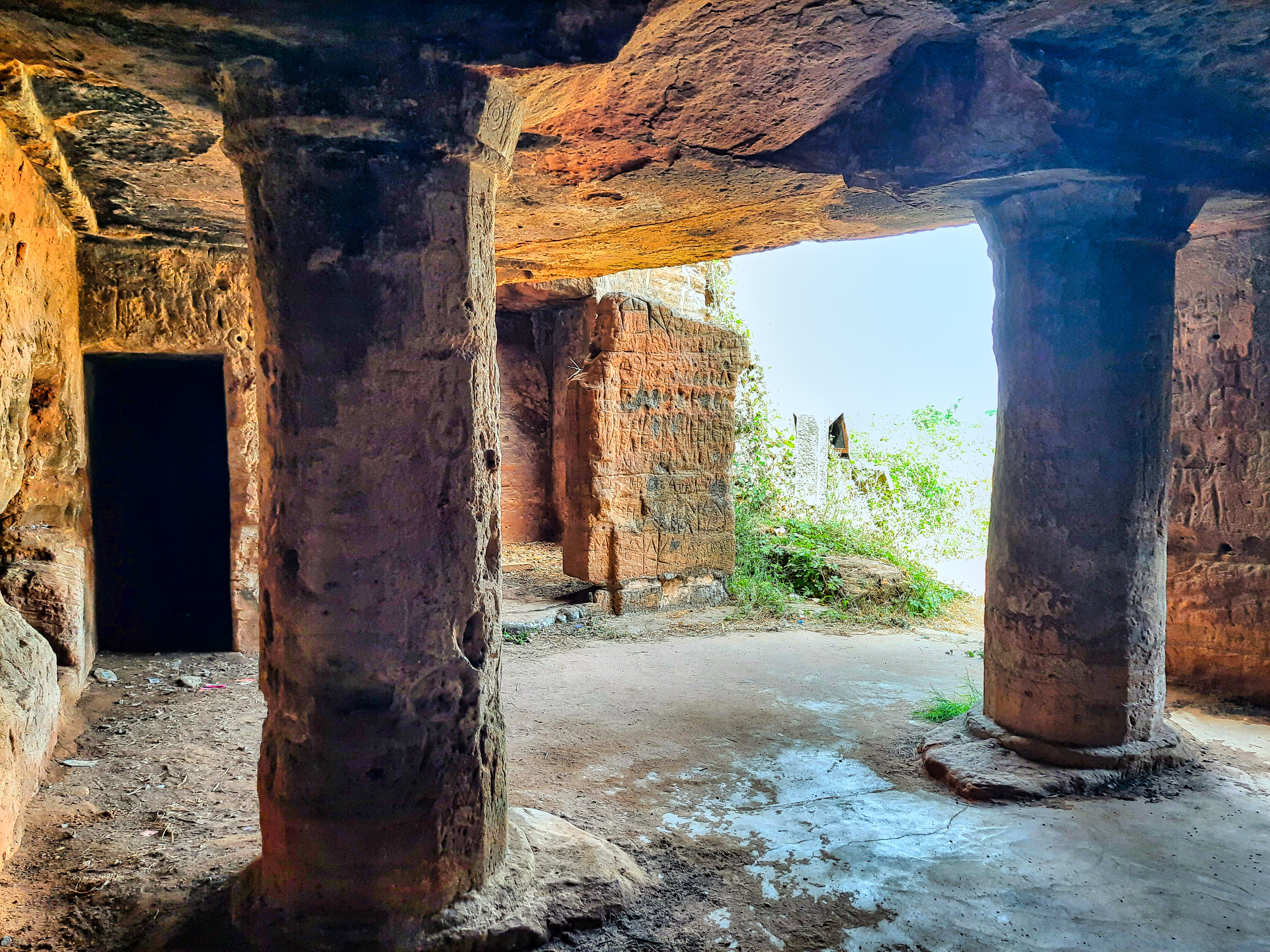
Siyot Caves - Kutch, Gujarat - 2nd century CE

=== Second wave of cave construction (5th-6th century CE) ===
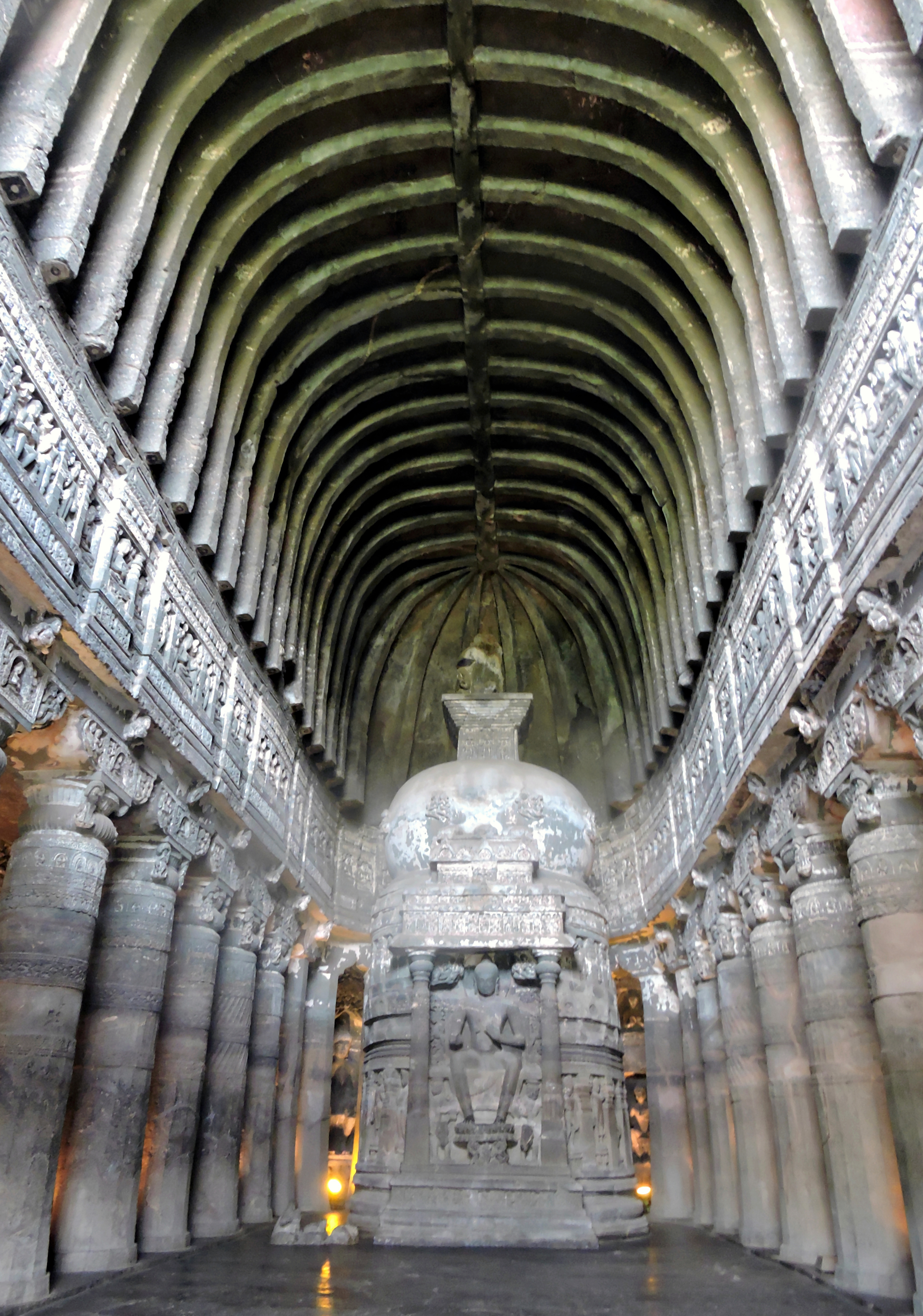
Cave 26 in Ajanta, circa 480 CE

The construction of caves would wane after the 2nd century CE, possibly due to the rise of Mahayana Buddhism and the associated intense architectural and artistic production in Gandhara and Amaravati. The building of rock-cut caves would revive briefly in the 6th century CE, with the magnificent achievements of Ajanta and Ellora, before finally subsiding as Hinduism replaced Buddhism in the sub-continent, and stand-alone temples became more prevalent.

The Ajanta Caves in Maharashtra, a World Heritage Site, are 30 rock-cut cave Buddhist temples carved into the sheer vertical side of a gorge near a waterfall-fed pool located in the hills of the Sahyadri mountains. Like all the locations of Buddhist caves, this one is located near main trade routes and spans six centuries beginning in the 2nd or 1st century B.C. A period of intense building activity at this site occurred under the Vakataka king Harisena between 460 and 478 A profuse variety of decorative sculpture, intricately carved columns and carved reliefs are found, including exquisitely carved cornices and pilaster. Skilled artisans crafted living rock to imitate timbered wood (such as lintels) in construction and grain and intricate decorative carving, although such architectural elements were ornamental and not functional in the classical sense.

Later many Hindu kings from southern India patronize many cave temples dedicated to Hindu gods and goddesses. One such prominent example of cave temple architecture are the Badami Cave Temples at Badami, the early Chalukya capital, carved out in the 6th century. There are four cave temples hewn from the sides of cliffs, three Hindu and one Jain, that contain carved architectural elements such as decorative pillars and brackets as well as finely carved sculpture and richly etched ceiling panels. Nearby are many small Buddhist cave shrines.

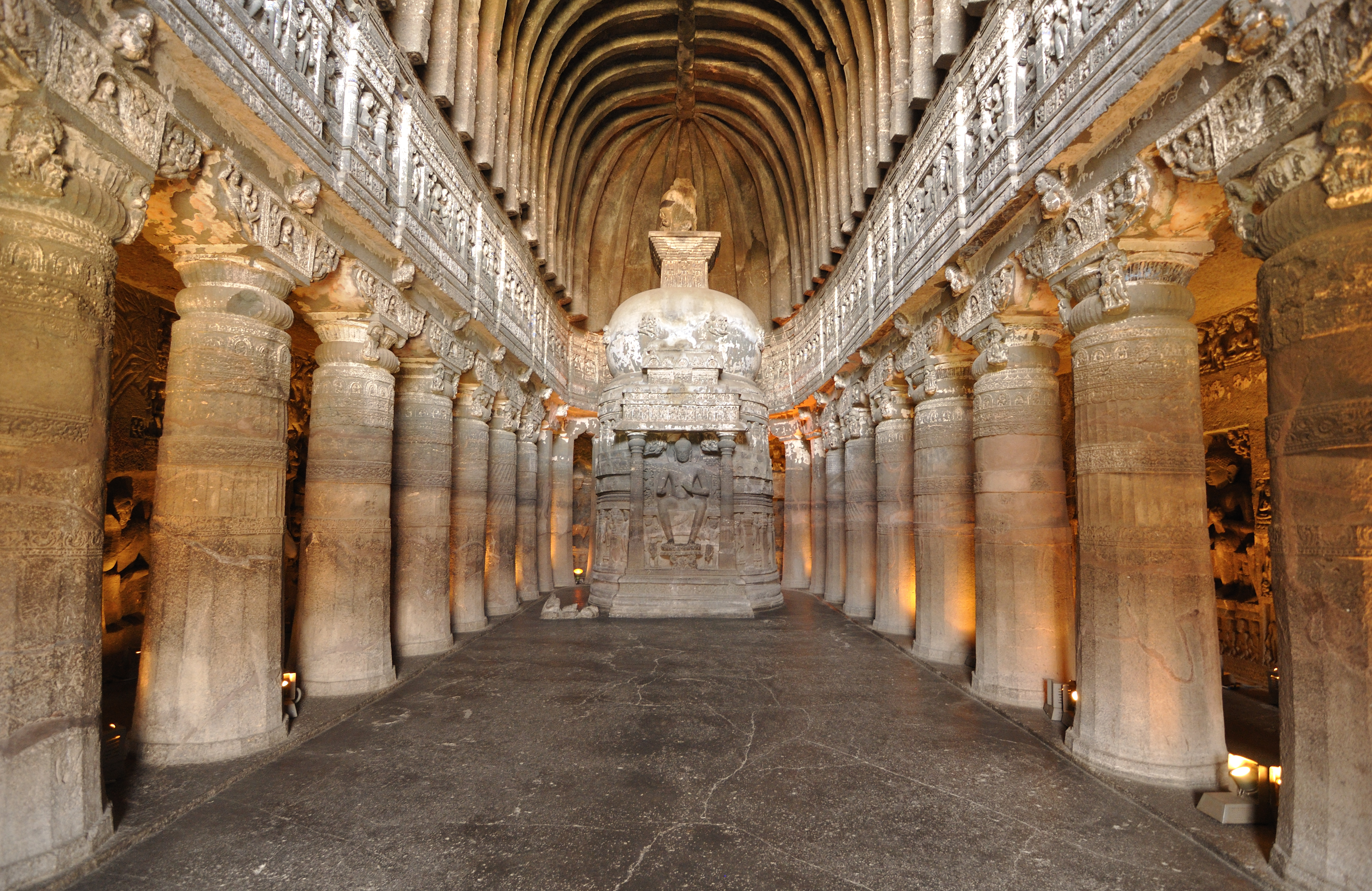
The Ajanta Caves are 30 rock-cut Buddhist cave monument built under the Vakatakas

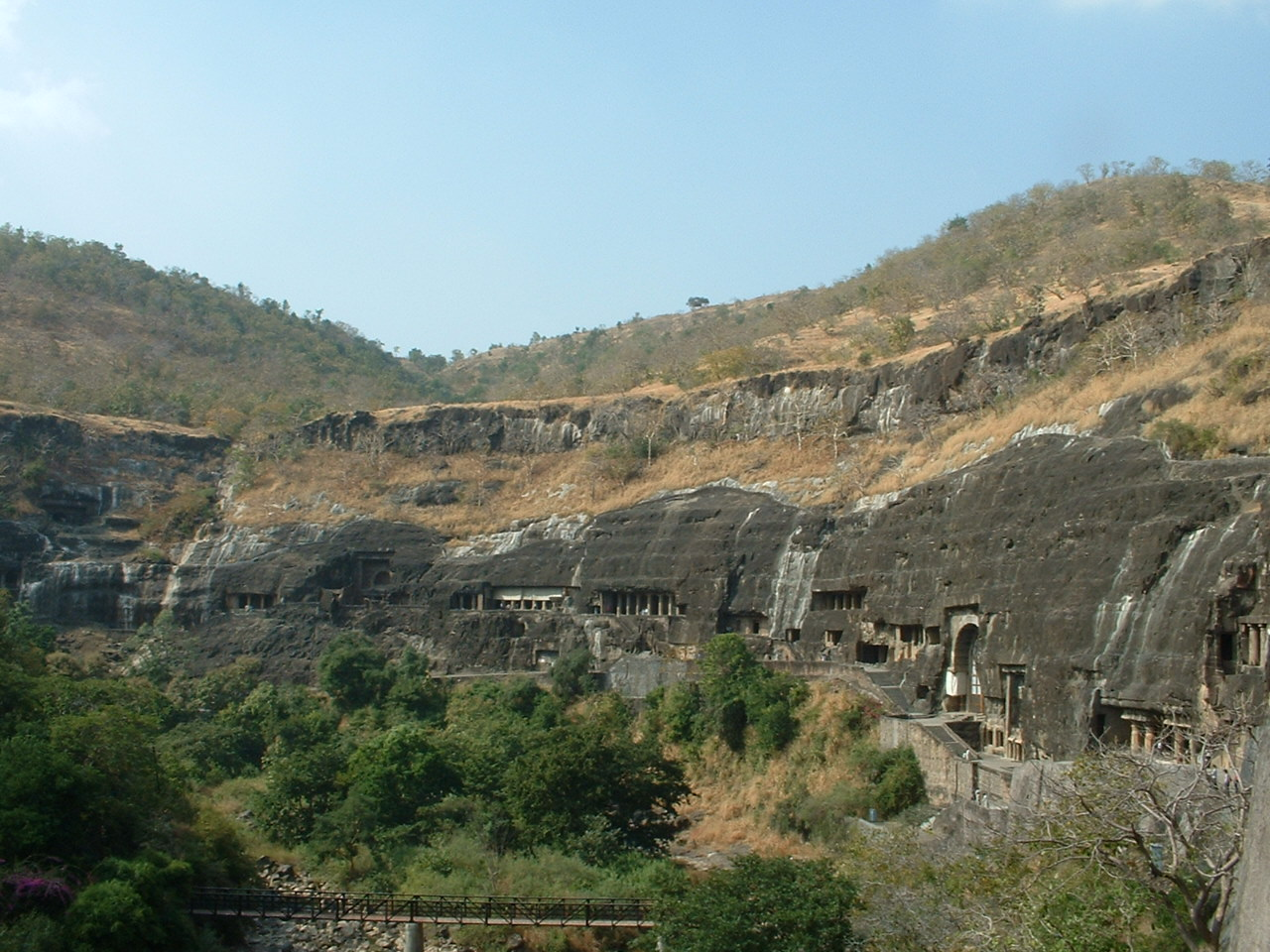
Some of the 29 Ajanta Caves

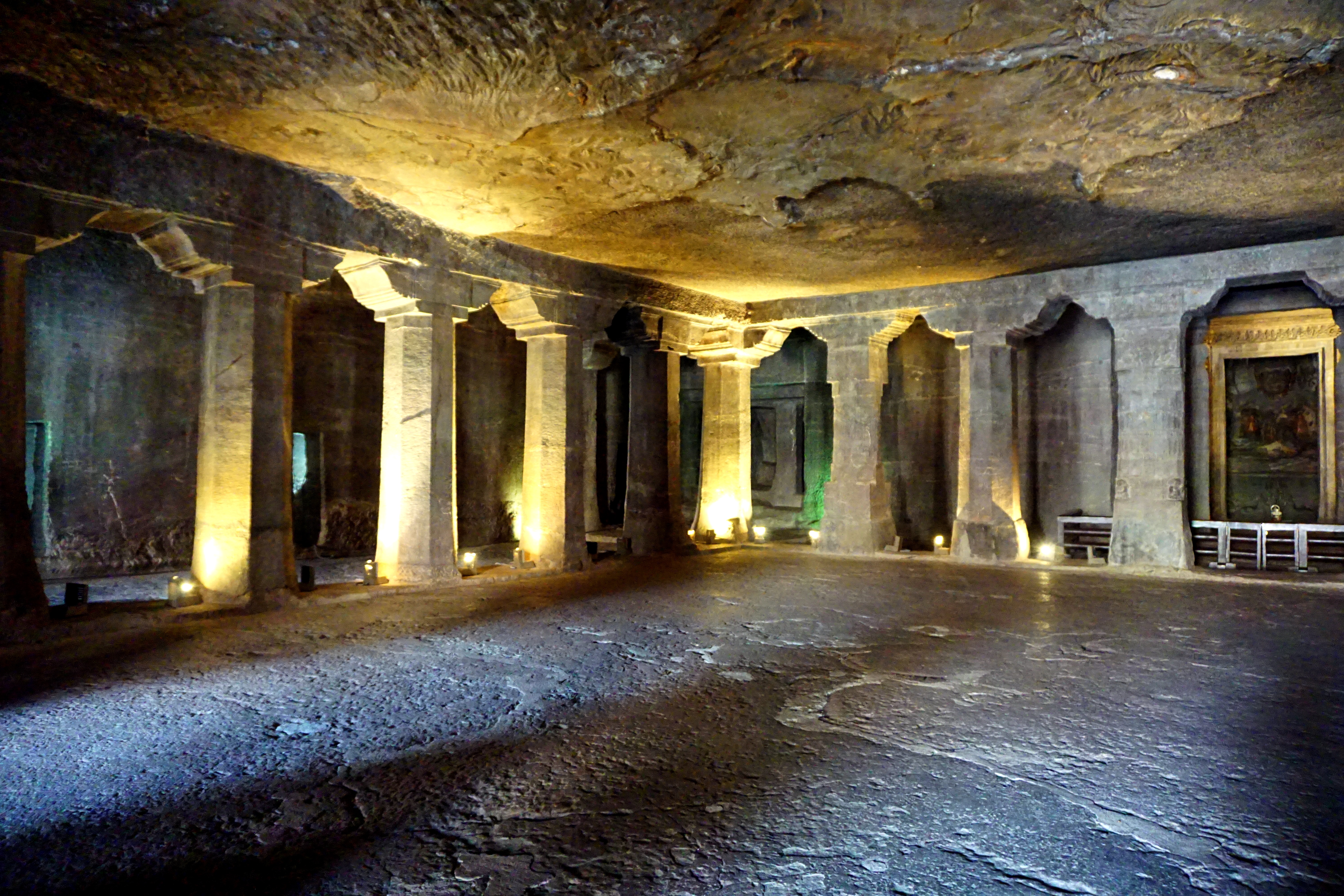
A monastery, or vihara, with its square hall surrounded by monks' cells. Ajanta Caves, no. 4
