= Saptaparni Cave =

Buddhist cave in Bihar, India

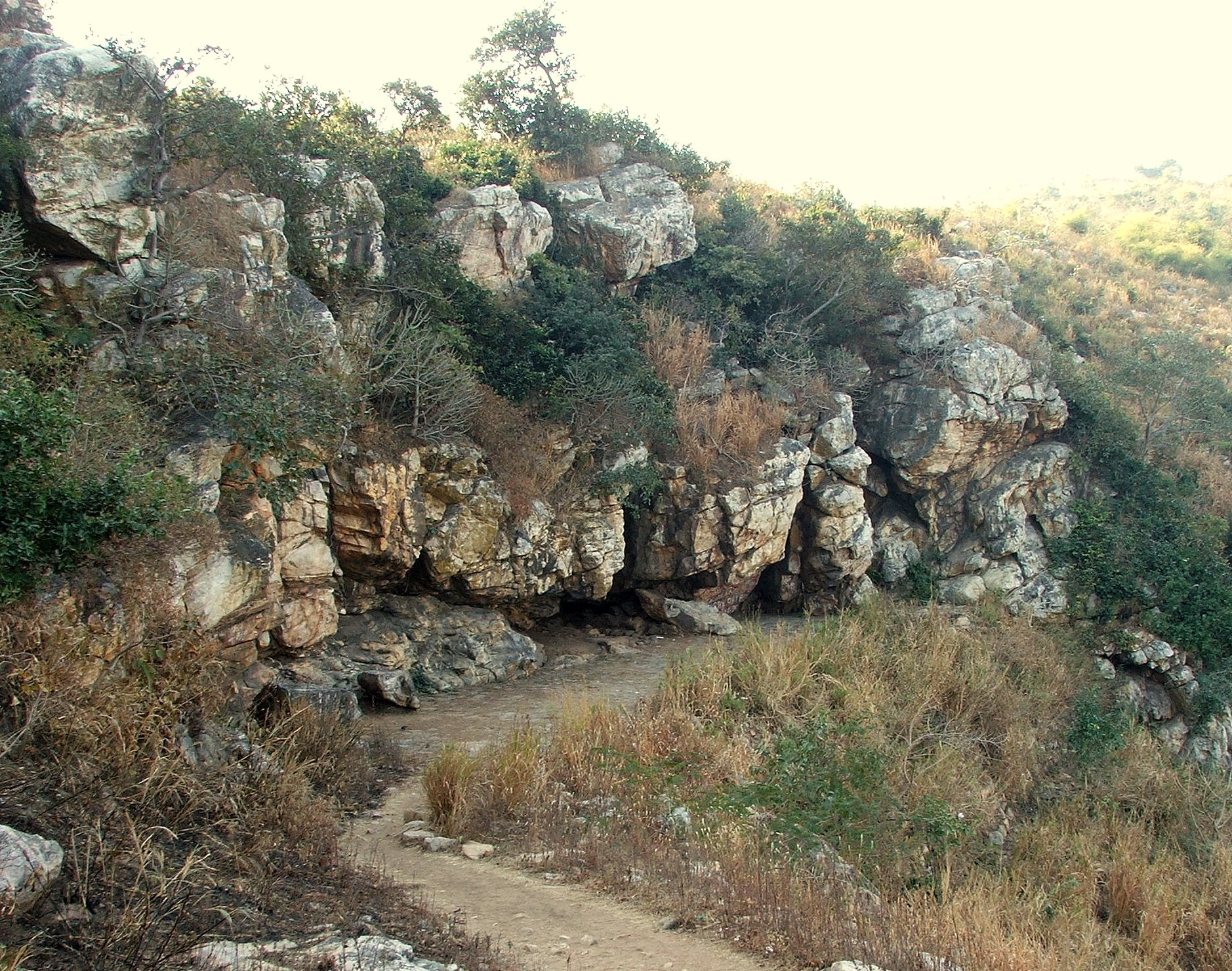
- Saptaparni Cave

- Location within India Location within Bihar
- 25.007175°N 85.410792°E
- Location: Rajgir, Bihar

Site notes
- Governing body: Archeological Survey of India

Saptparni Cave, also referred to as Sapta parni guha (Sanskrit) or sattapaṇṇi guhā (Pali), literally Seven-leaves-cave (cognate with sapta, sept), is a Buddhist cave site about 2 kilometres (1.2 mi) southwest from Rajgir, Bihar, India. It is embedded in a hill. The Saptaparni Cave is important in the Buddhist tradition, because many believe it to be the site in which Buddha spent some time before his death, and where the first Buddhist council was held after Buddha died (paranirvana). It is here that a council of few hundred monks decided to appoint Ananda, Buddha's cousin, and Upali, who had accompanied the Buddha when he gave sermons in north India, to compose Buddha's teachings for the future generations. This was of special importance because the Buddha never wrote down his teachings. After the meeting in Saptaparni Cave, Ananda created an oral tradition of Buddha's teaching from his memory, prefacing it with "Thus have I heard on one occasion". Upali is credited with reciting the Vinaya (discipline), or "rules for the Bhikshus". This tradition is found in Vinaya Pitaka II.284 through II.287 and Digha Nikaya II.154.

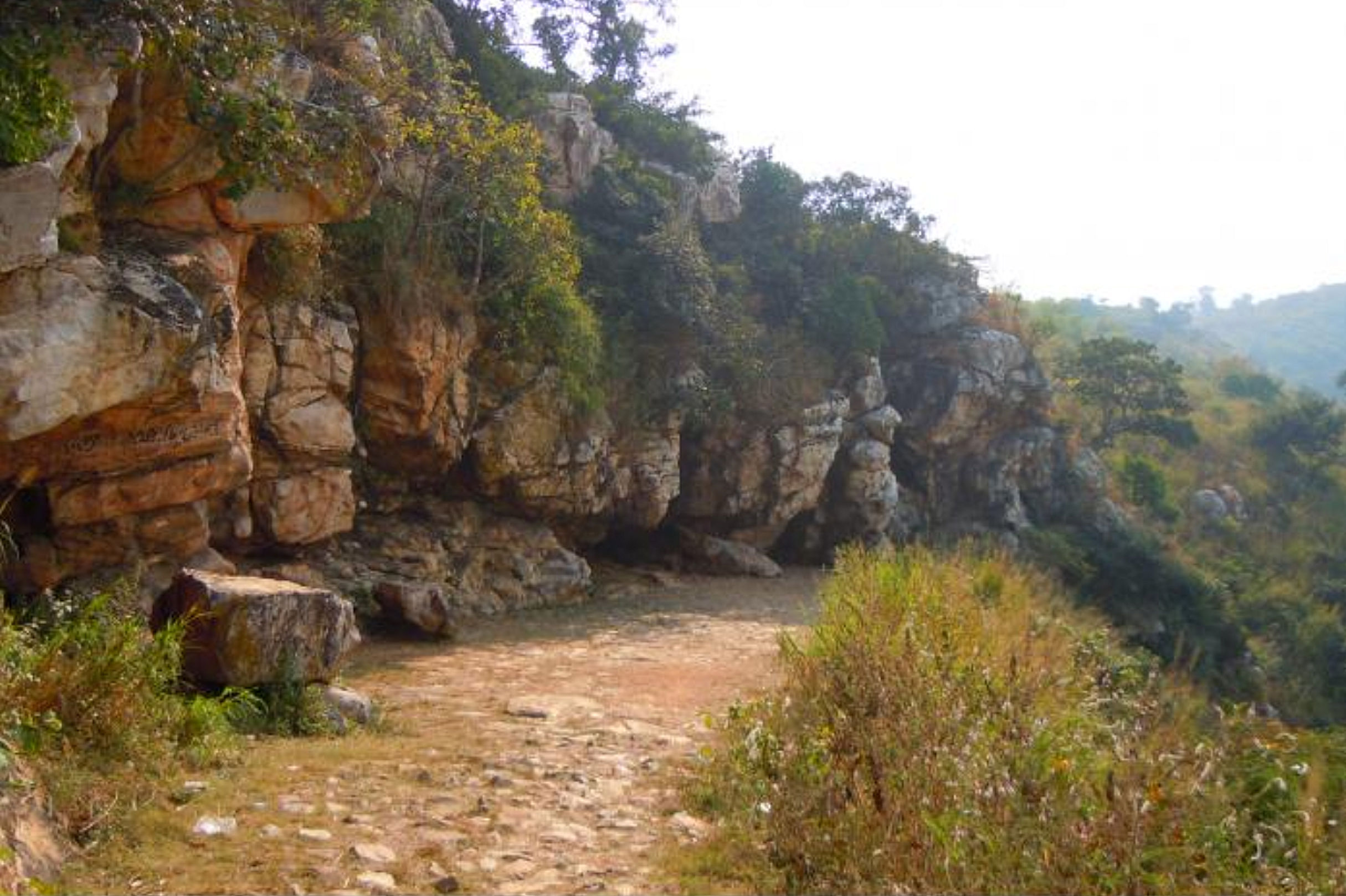
Saptaparani caves, Rajgir

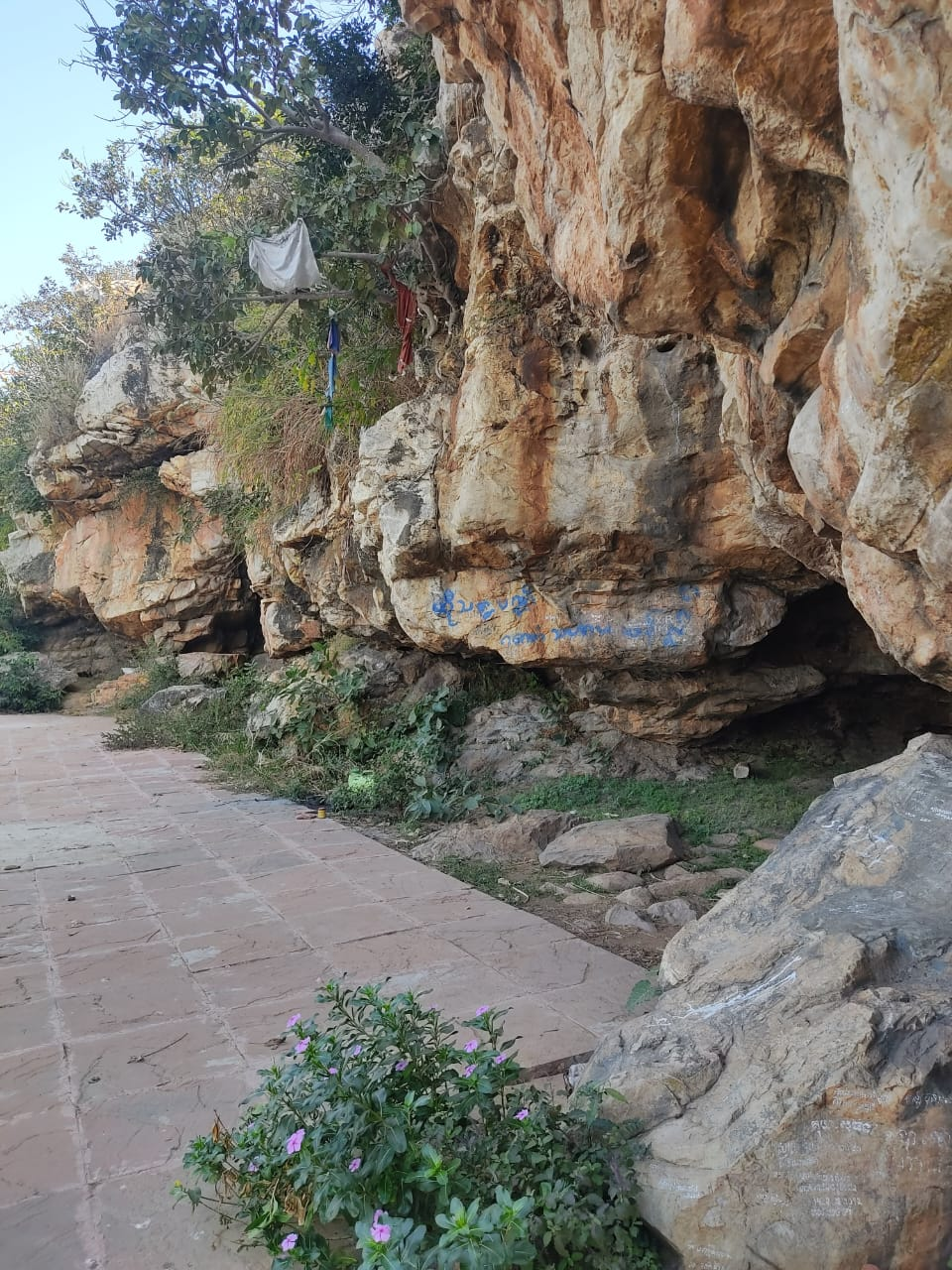
Saptaparni cave entrance.
