= Siyot Caves =

Caves in Gujarat, India

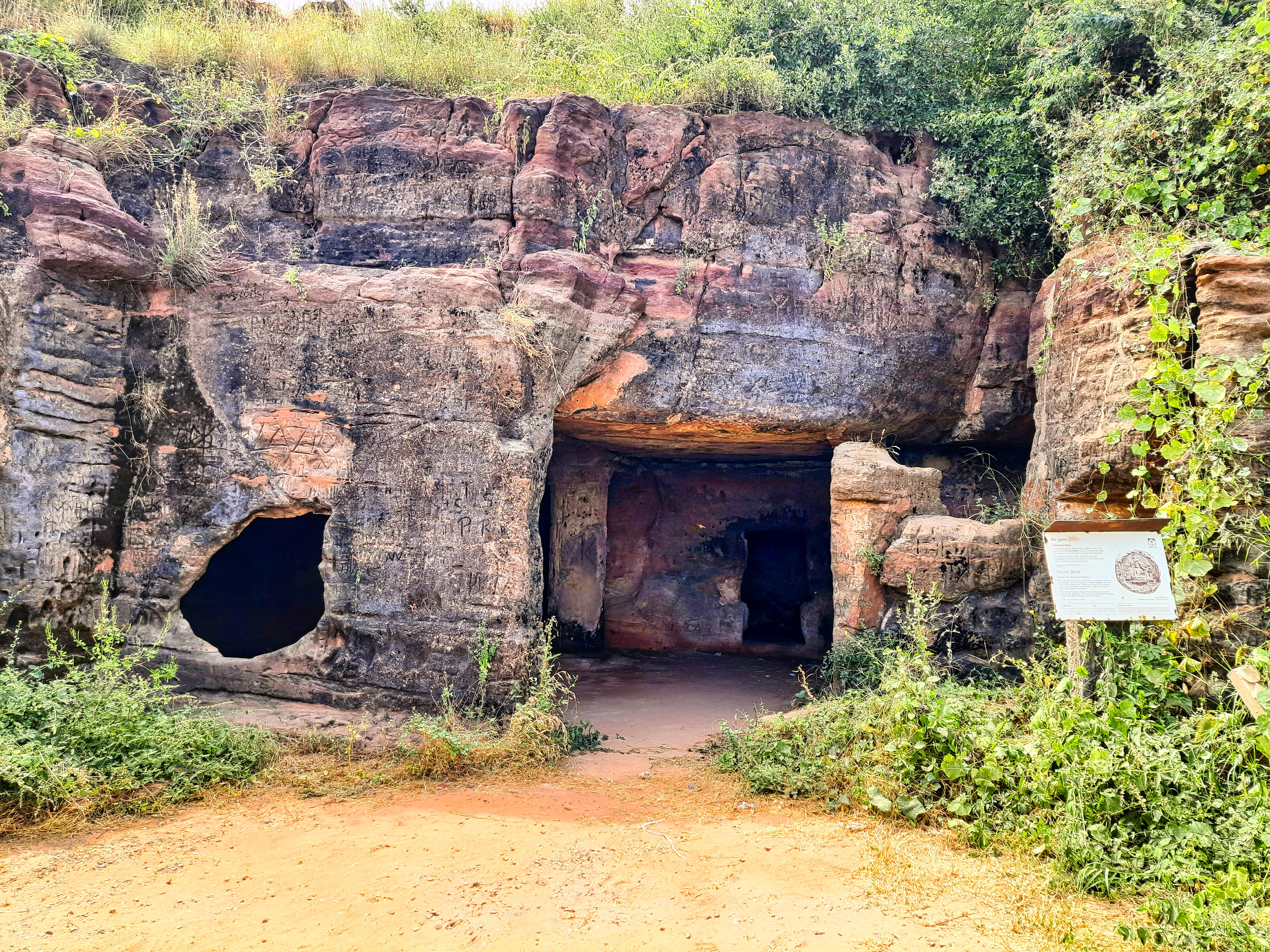
- Entrance of the cave
- Interactive map of Siyot Caves
- Location: Siyot village, Kutch district, Gujarat, India
- Coordinates: 23.7738889°N 68.8763889°E

The Siyot Caves, sometimes referred to as the Kateshwar Buddhist Caves, are five rock-cut caves located near Siyot village in the Lakpat Taluka of Kutch district, Gujarat, India. The caves are believed to belong to the first century AD.

The main cave has east facing sanctum, ambulatory and space divisions which suggests a Shiva temple from the first or second century. The cave was used by Buddhists later which can be concluded based on the seals found herein and the traces of Brahmi inscriptions. Other caves are simple single cells which were probably the part of eighty Buddhist caves located near the mouth of the Indus River as reported by Xuanzang in seventh century. Local people believe that these caves were used by dacoits to hide things looted from people in past. Their architectural and monastic features show similarities to the Buddhist cave traditions of Central Asia, including the Bamiyan Caves in present-day Afghanistan, where in 2008 ancient Rogan oil paintings were identified among the oldest known examples in the world. However, no Rogan paintings or related oil-based textile artworks have been found in the Siyot Caves, though the stylistic parallels indicate historical cultural and religious exchanges along early trade routes.

Excavations in 1988–89 recovered clay seals engraved with Buddha images in various mudras and seals engraved with late Brahmi and Devnagari inscriptions. Other findings were copper rings, Gadhaiya coins, terracotta Nandi with bell and chain, different types of earthen wares like Surahi. Based on stratigraphic evidence, it is established that the site was occupied by Buddhist before it was again occupied by Shaivaites around twelfth or thirteenth century. The site was repaired after 2001 Gujarat earthquake.

There is a primitive stepwell located nearby.

== Gallery ==
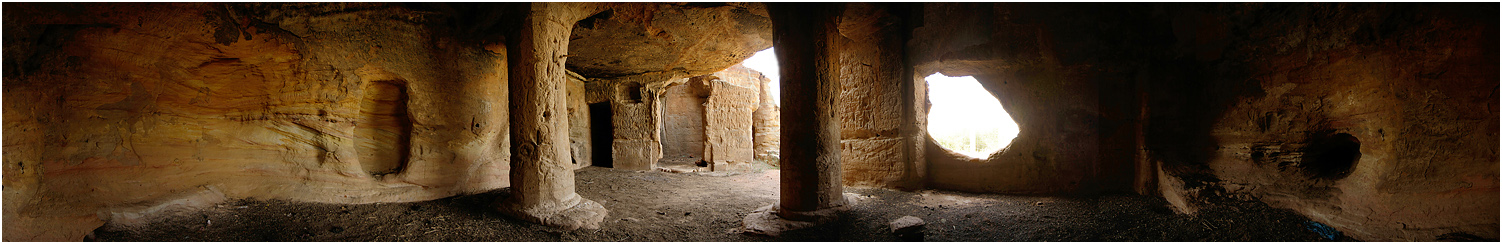
Main cave from inside

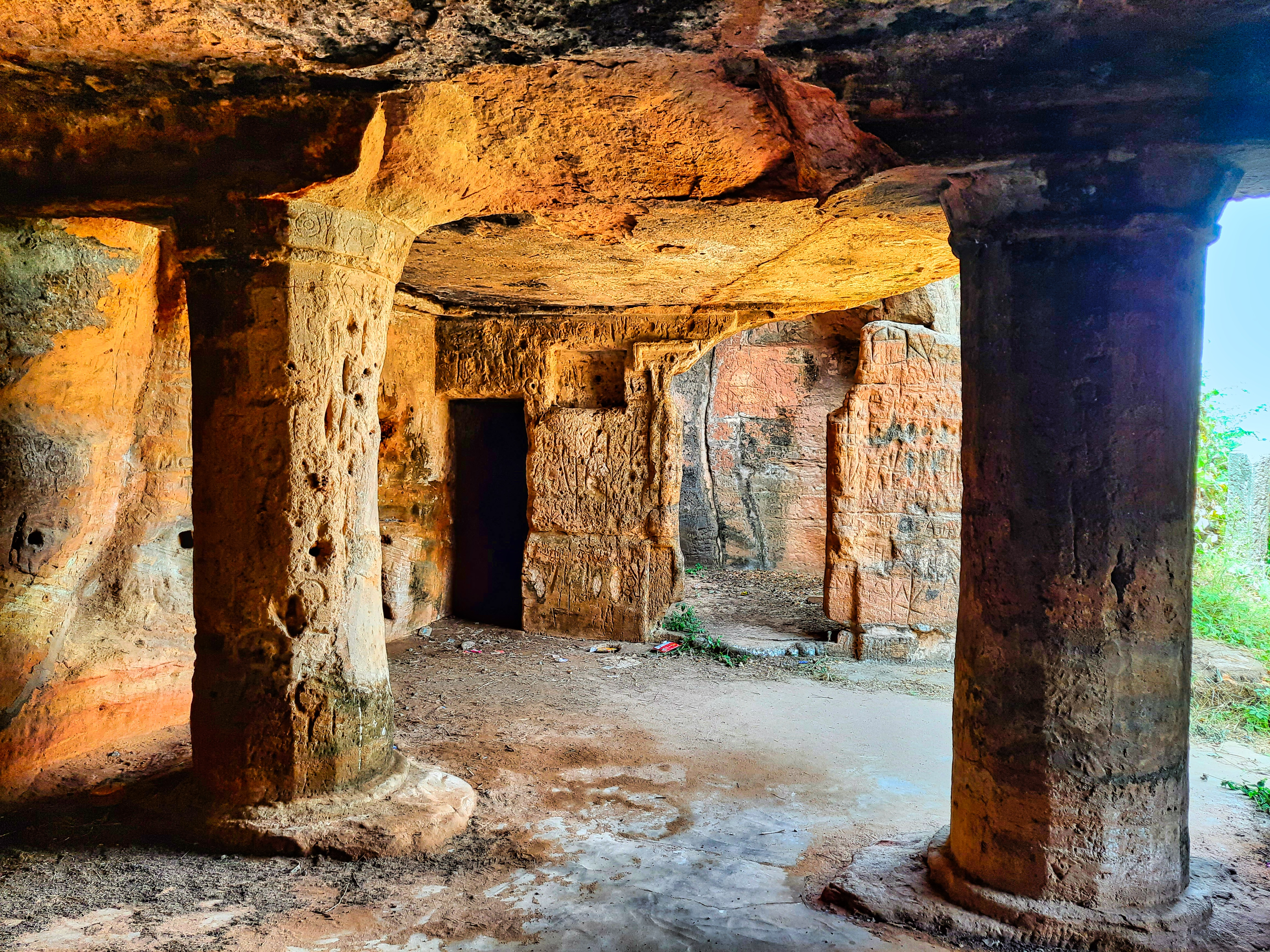
Interior

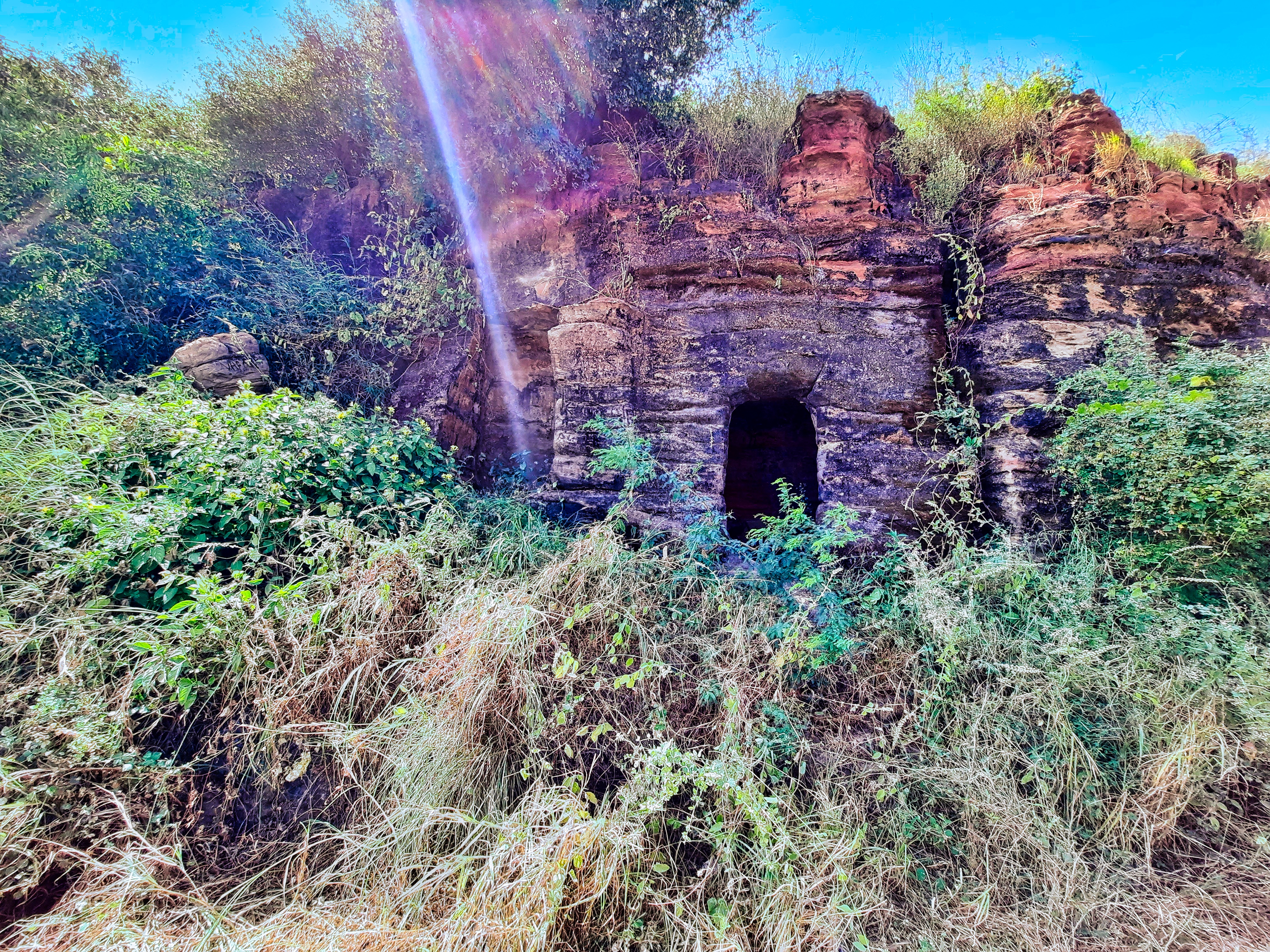
One of caves
