= Sitamarhi Cave =

Artificial cave in Bihar, India

Coordinates: 24.90°N 85.28°E

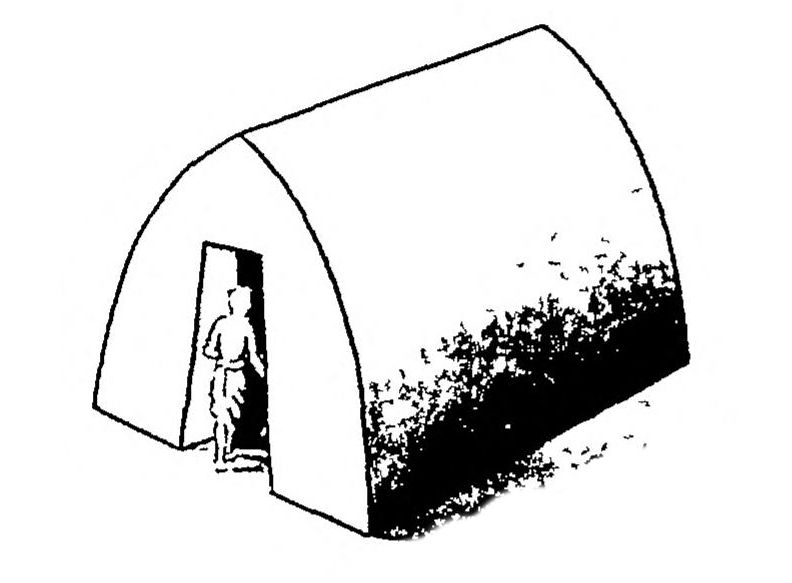
Sitamarhi Cave.

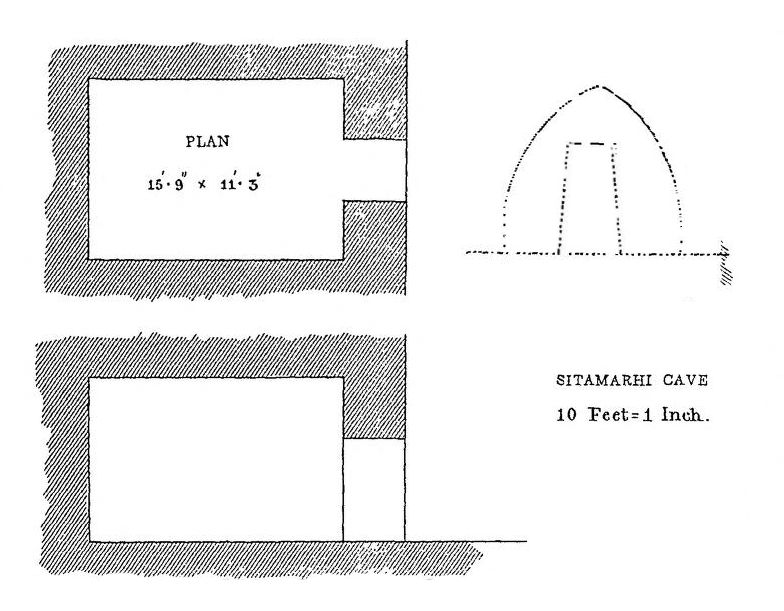
Plan of the Sitamarhi Cave.

Sitamarhi Cave is an Indian artificial cave, and an important example of Indian rock-cut architecture. Located 20 km southwest of Rajgir and 10 km southwest of Hisua, it dates from the Maurya Empire. It was hewn in a huge hemispherical rock of granite.

The cave has the structure and Mauryan polish qualities of the Barabar caves, but without any inscriptions. It is smaller than the Barabar caves, measuring only 4.91x3.43m, with a ceiling height of 2.01m. The entrance is also trapezoidal, like the Barabar caves.

The cave is sometimes considered part of the "Rajgir group", together with Son Bhandar Caves.
