= Nasik Caves =

Ancient Buddhist and Jain caves in India

Trirashmi Caves Buddha and Jain leni Caves
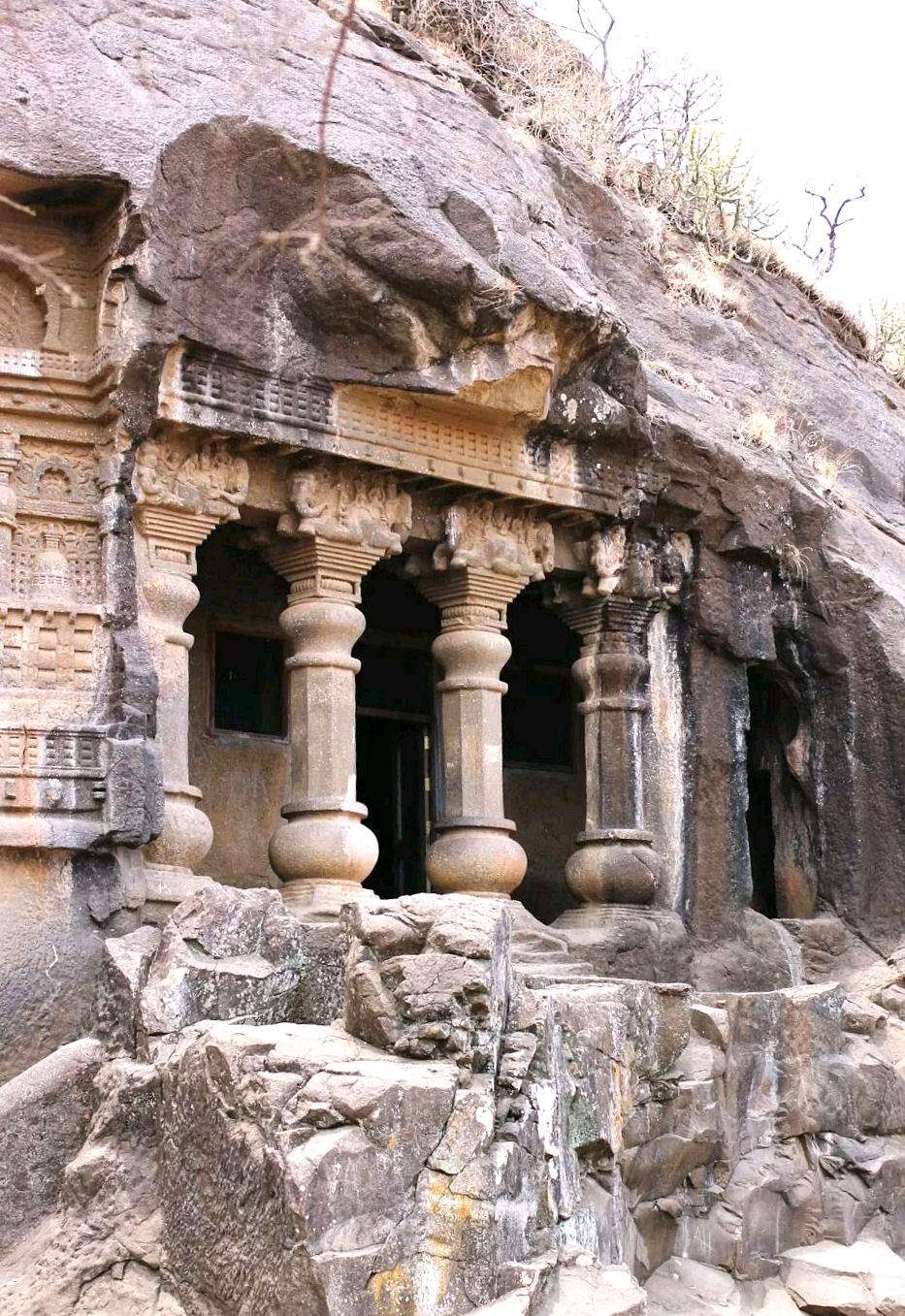
- Nasik Caves, Cave No. 17, built circa 120 CE.

- Location within India Location within Maharashtra
- Location: Nashik, Maharashtra, India
- Coordinates: 19.9412°N 73.7486°E

The Trirashmi Caves, or Nashik Caves or Pandavleni is a holy Buddhist and Jain site located about 8 km south of the centre of Nashik (or Nasik), Maharashtra, India. Most of the caves are viharas except for Cave 18 which is a chaitya of the 1st century BCE. The style of some of the elaborate pillars or columns, for example in caves 3 and 10, is an important example of the development of the form. Cave 11 is a Jain cave dedicated to Lord Vrishabhanath (Rishabhanatha), the first Tirthankara of Jainism. Some scholars suggest that the name Pandavleni is derived from the Pandavas, characters in the Mahabharata epic, as some caves contain inscriptions related to early Brahmin or Hindu beliefs. Other caves in this Maharashtra area include the Karla Caves, Bhaja Caves, Patan Caves and Bedse Caves.

== Caves ==
These are a group of twenty-four Early Buddhist caves whose excavation was financed by kings, merchants, devotees and foreigners who supported Jainism and Buddhism. Cave No. 3 is a large vihara or monastery with some interesting sculptures. Cave No. 10 is also a vihara, almost identical in design to Cave No. 3, but finer in detail and thought to be nearly as old as the Karla Caves near Lonavala. Cave No. 18 is a chaitya worship hall believed to be similar in date to the Karla Caves, with a finely sculptured and elaborate facade. This cave houses a stone-cut stupa, statues of the Buddha, Jain Tirthankara Ṛṣabhadeva, and icons of the yakṣas Maṇibhadra and Ambikā. The chaitya hall served as a chamber used for communal ceremonies, chanting, walking and seated meditation.There are water tanks that have been skilfully carved out of the solid rock.

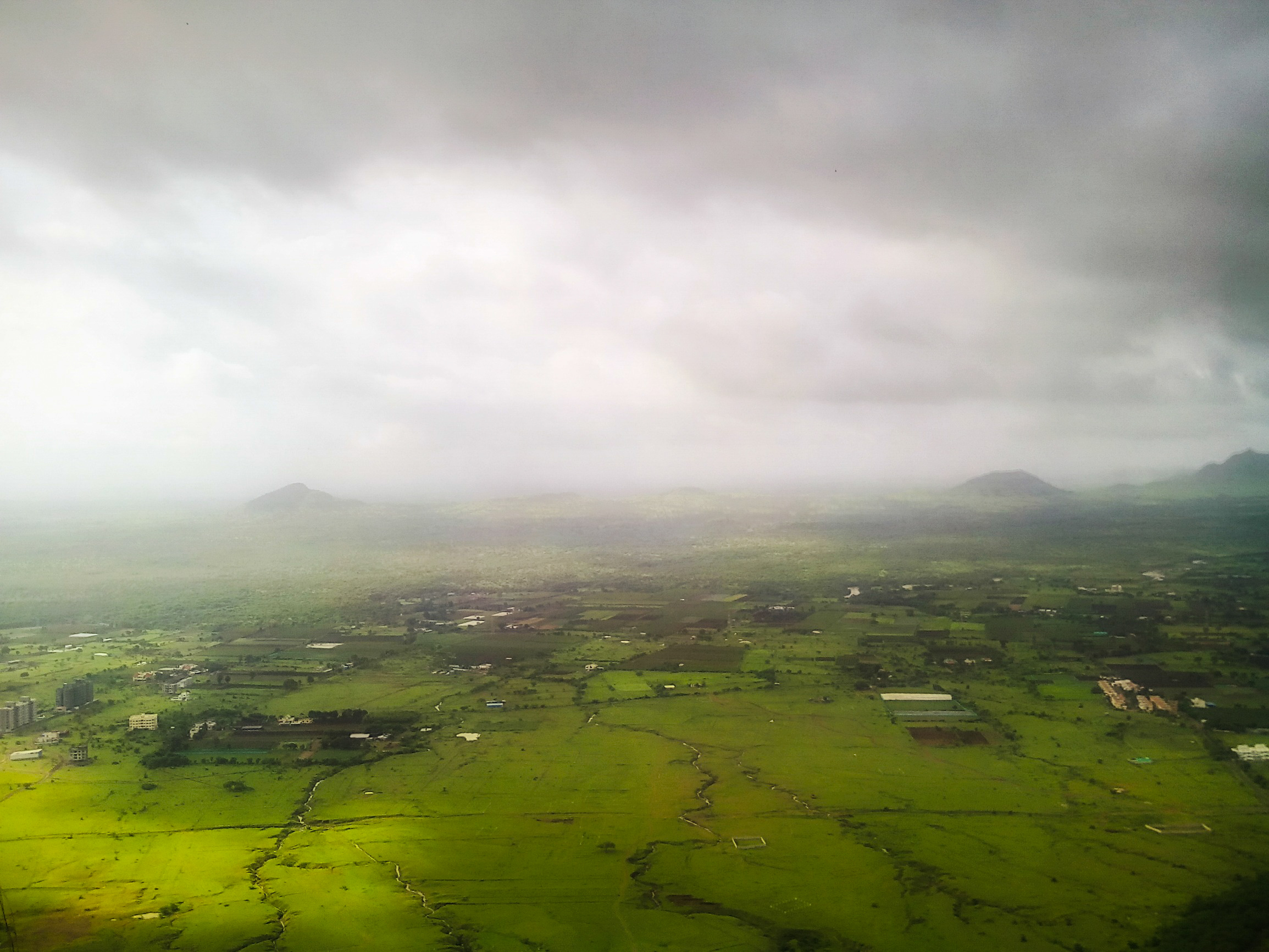
Panorama from the caves, during the monsoon season.

The Nasik caves are some of the oldest in Maharashtra. Some are large and contain numerous rock-cut chambers that served as a viharas or monasteries for Jain and Buddhist monks. One of the older viharas contains a particularly elaborate facade, fine in sculptural detail and thought to be nearly as old as the Karla Cave near Lonavala

Some of the caves have images of the Buddha, bodhisattvas, sculptures representing the kings, farmers, merchants and other rich iconography.

The site has an ancient water management system with several water tanks skillfully chiseled out of solid rock.

== History ==
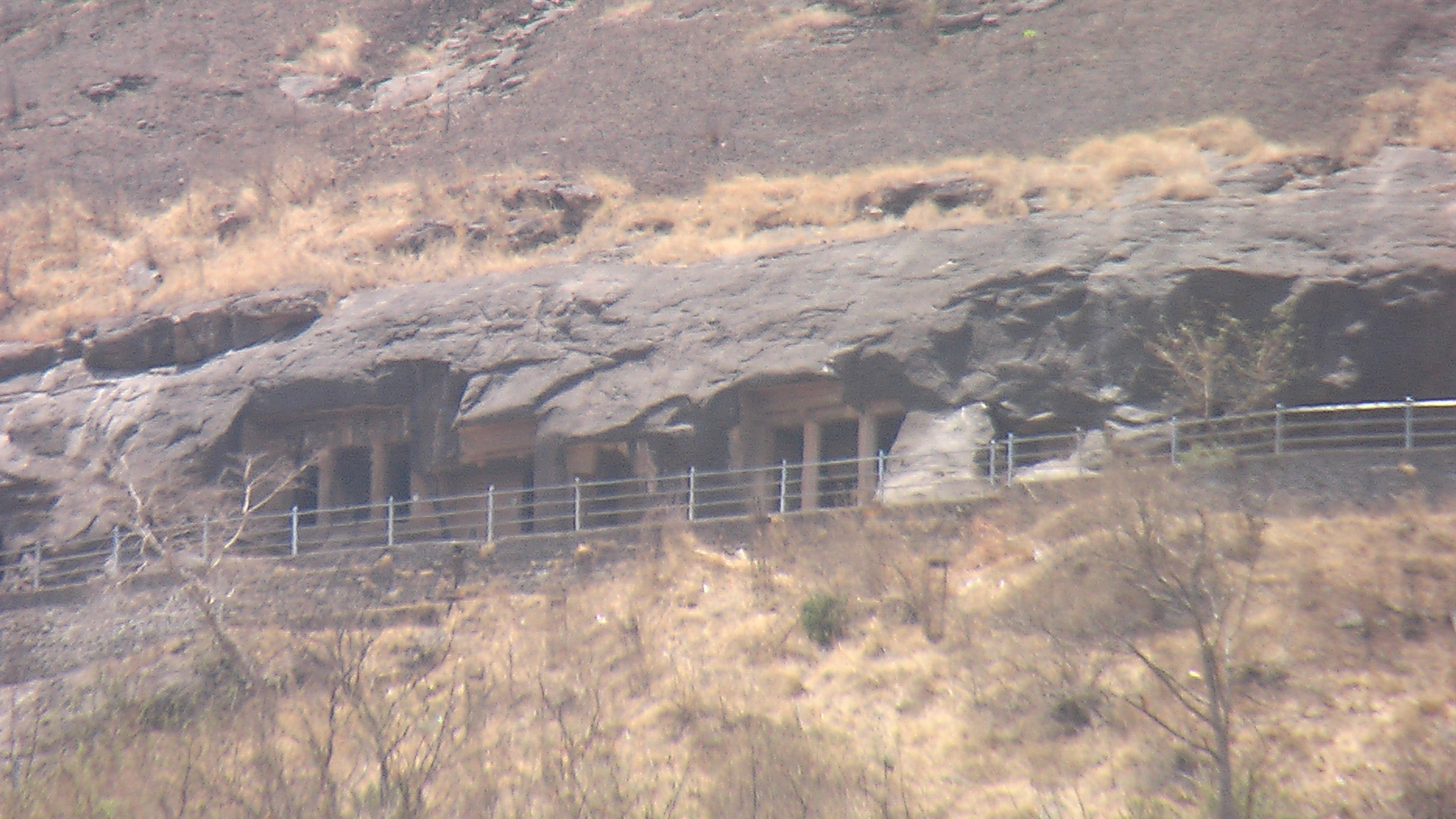
Part of the caves (Caves No.6 to No.8) at Pandavleni.

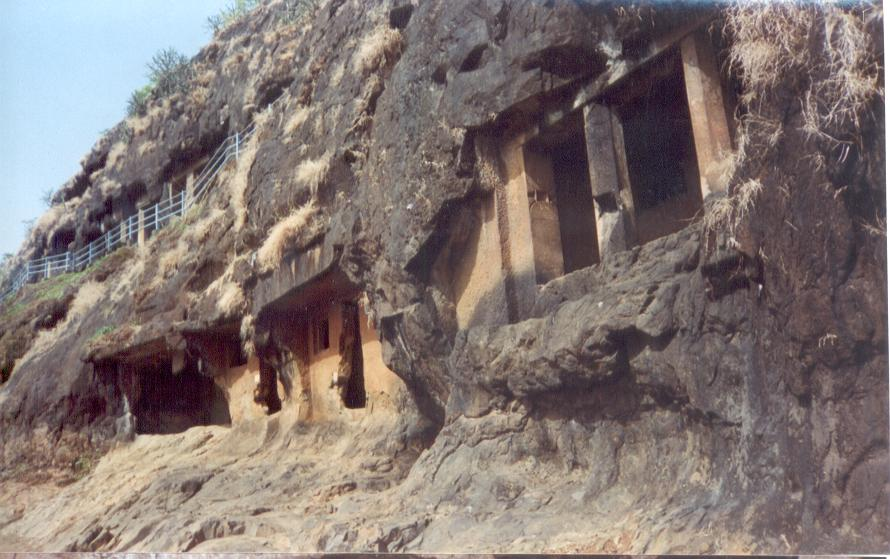
Additional caves under the visitor's path at Pandavleni.

The caves can be traced back to the 1st century BCE by inscriptions that record donations made by kings and laity. Out of the twenty-four caves, two caves are a major attraction - cave No. 18, a chaitya (prayer hall) with a stupa, and cave No. 10, structurally complete with famous inscriptions. Both of the caves have carved images of the Buddha and face eastwards.

The various inscriptions confirm that Nasik was ruled by three dynasties – the Western Kshatrapas, the Satavahanas and the Abhiras. It seems there was always a conflict between Satavahanas and the Kshatrapas over supremacy. However, all the kings supported Buddhism. The inscriptions also confirm that local merchants donated huge sums for cave excavation and development.

=== Layout and content ===
The group of 24 caves were cut in a long line on the north face of a hill called Trirasmi. The importance of this group lies not only in the number of inscriptions of great historical significance belonging to the reigns of Satavahana and Kshaharata rulers, but also in representing a brilliant phase in the rock-cut architecture of the second century CE. There are 24 excavations though many seem small and less historically important. Starting at the east end, the caves are numbered westward. They are almost entirely of an early date, and while many were excavated to support the schools of Early Buddhism, several show the artistic influence and styles of later schools called Mahayana. Mostly, the interior of the caves are starkly plain, in contrast to the heavily ornamented exterior.

== The caves and their inscriptions ==
Inscriptions in caves 3, 11, 12, 13, 14, 15, 19 and 20 are legible. Other inscriptions note the names Gautamiputra Satkarni and Vashishthiputra Pulumavi of the Satavahanas, Ushavadata and his wife Dakshamitra, of the Western Satraps, and the Yavana (Indo-Greek) Dhammadeva.

Since the caves were inhabited by the Early Buddhism as well as Mahayana sects, one can see a confluence of structure and sculpture.

=== Caves No. 1-2 ===
Cave No.1
Cave No.1: except the ornamental frieze over the front, no part of this cave is finished; it has been planned for a vihara, with four columns between pilasters in front of a narrow veranda, but they are all left as square masses. A cell was begun at each end of the verandah. The front wall has been more recently partly blasted away. There are no inscriptions in this cave.
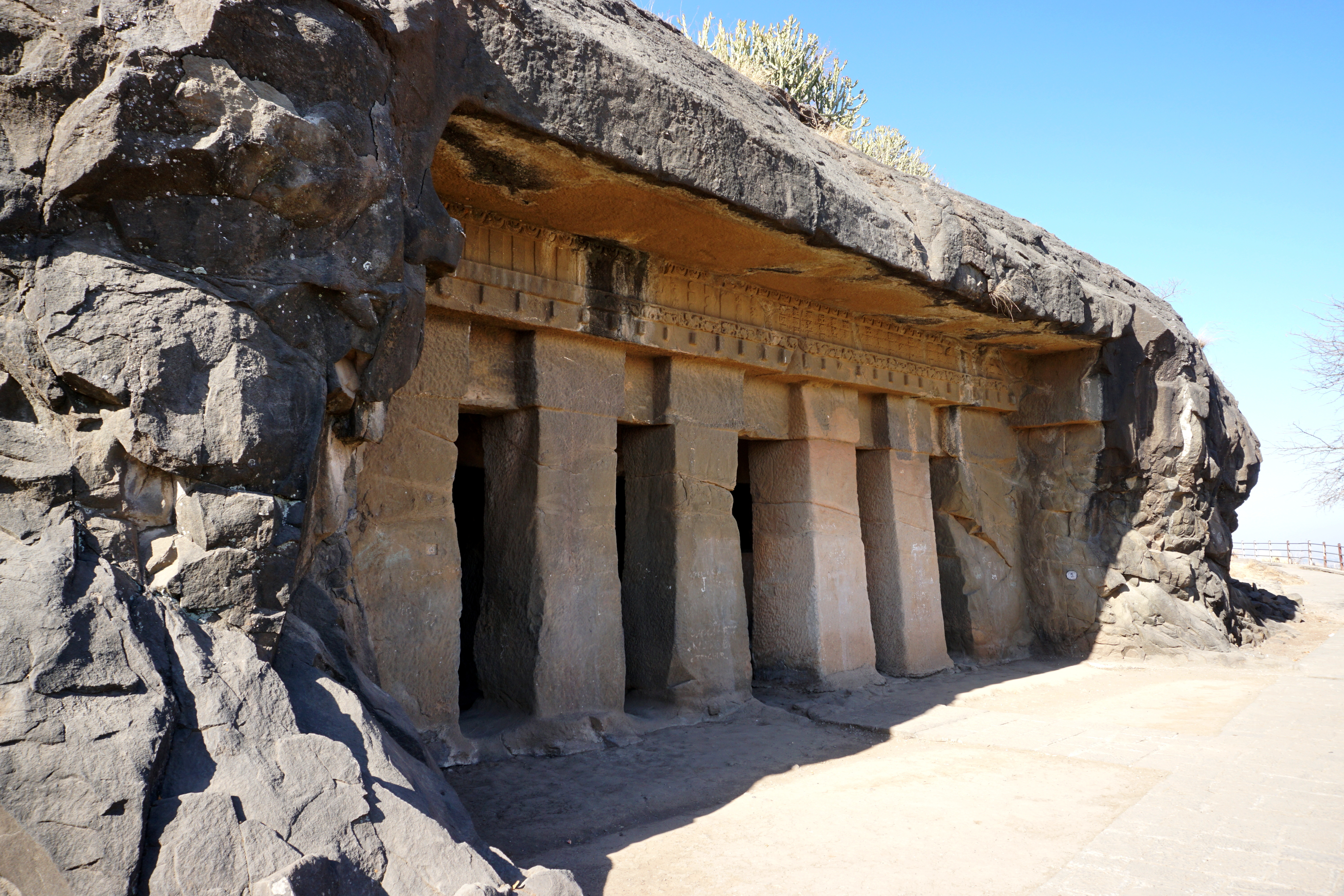
Cave 1, exterior

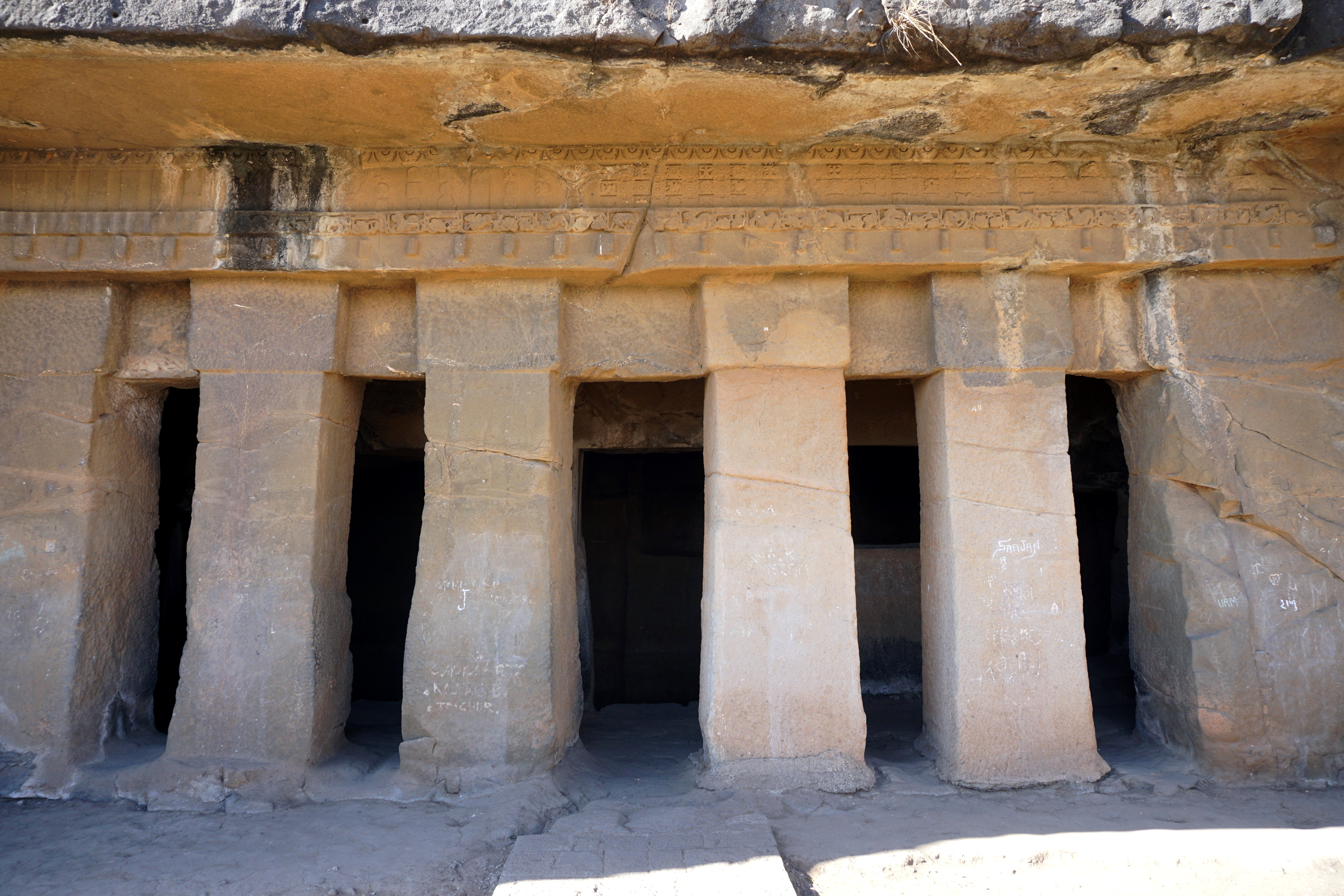
Cave 1, front

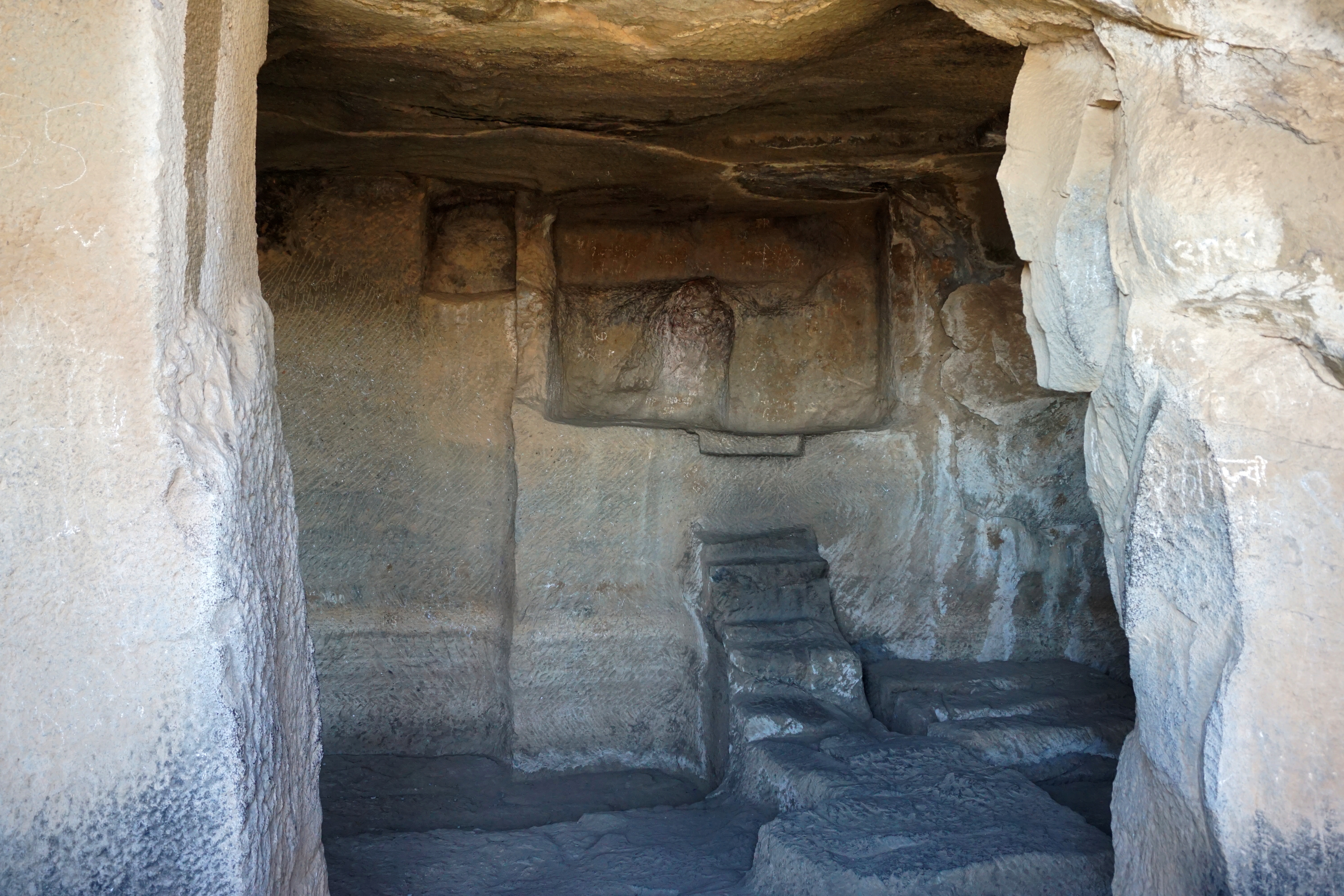
Interior

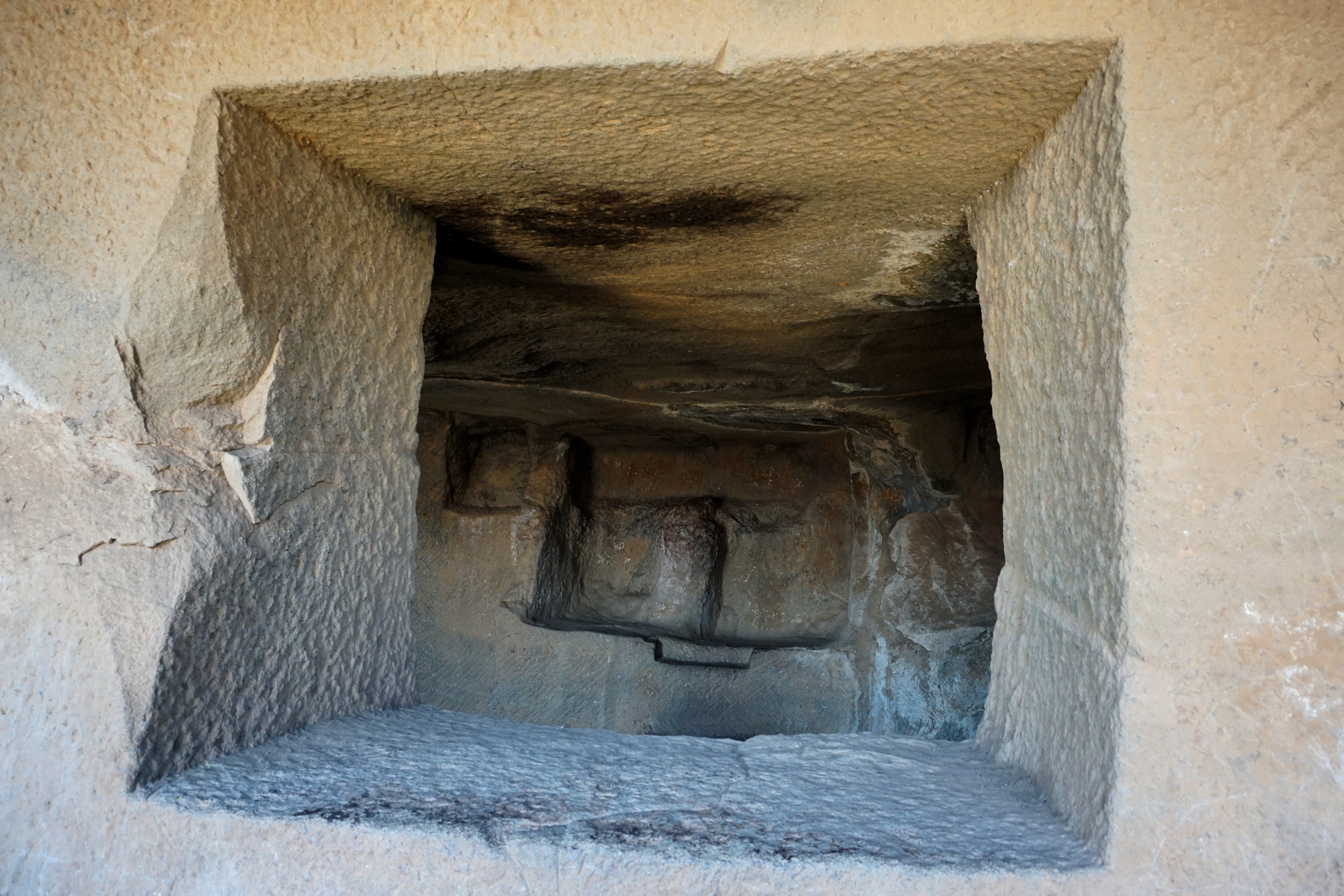
Interior

Cave No.2
Cave No.2 is a small excavation that may have been originally a veranda, 11.5 feet by 4.25 feet, with two cells at the back; but the front wall and dividing partition have been cut away, and the walls nearly covered with sculpture, consisting of sitting and standing Buddhas with attendant chauri-bearers, in some cases unfinished. These are the additions of Mahayana Buddhists of the sixth or seventh century CE.

The veranda apparently had two wooden pillars, and the projecting frieze is carved with the "rail pattern", much weather worn and very old. On the remaining section of the back wall of the veranda, close under the roof, is a fragment of an inscription of Satavahana king Sri Pulumavi (2nd century CE):

"Success! On the ..... day of the fifth -5th- fortnight of summer
in the sixth -6th- year of king Siri-Pulumayi, son of Vasithi...."

— Cave No.2, inscription No.1

Between this and the next cave are a tank with two openings above, a large scarped-out place, and two decayed recesses, one of them a tank; all along this space are blocks of rock blasted out or fallen down from above.

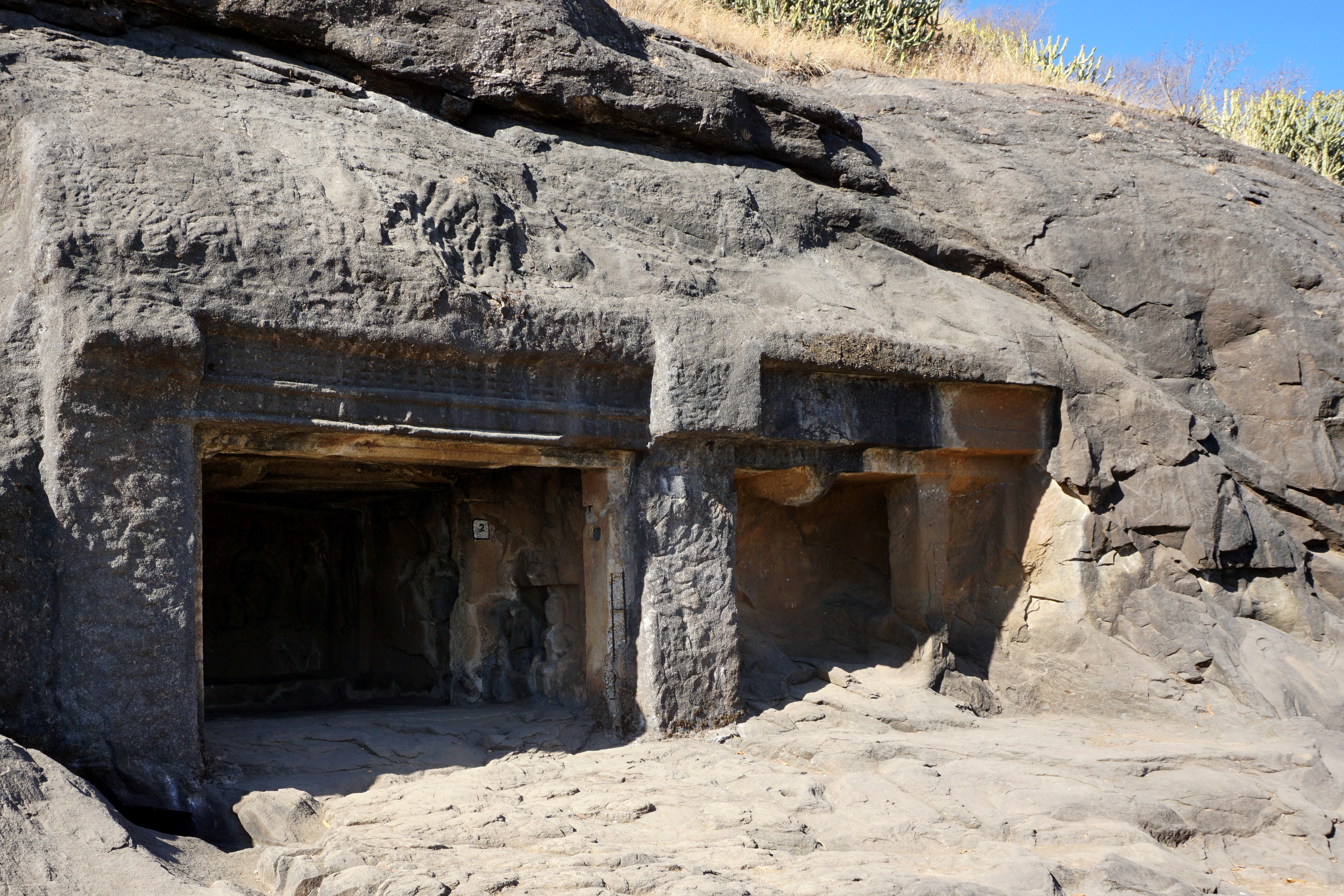
Cave 2, exterior

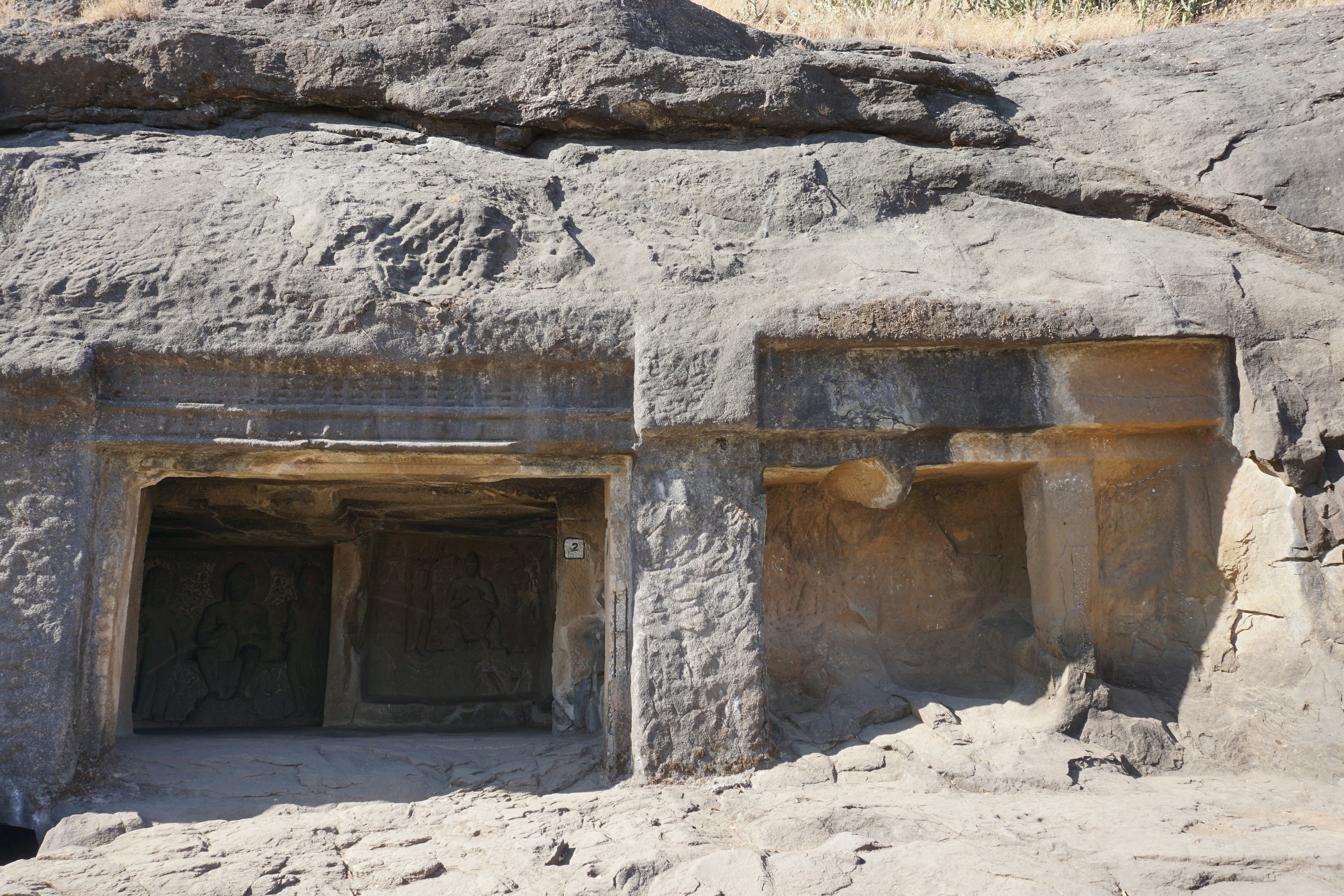
Cave 2, front

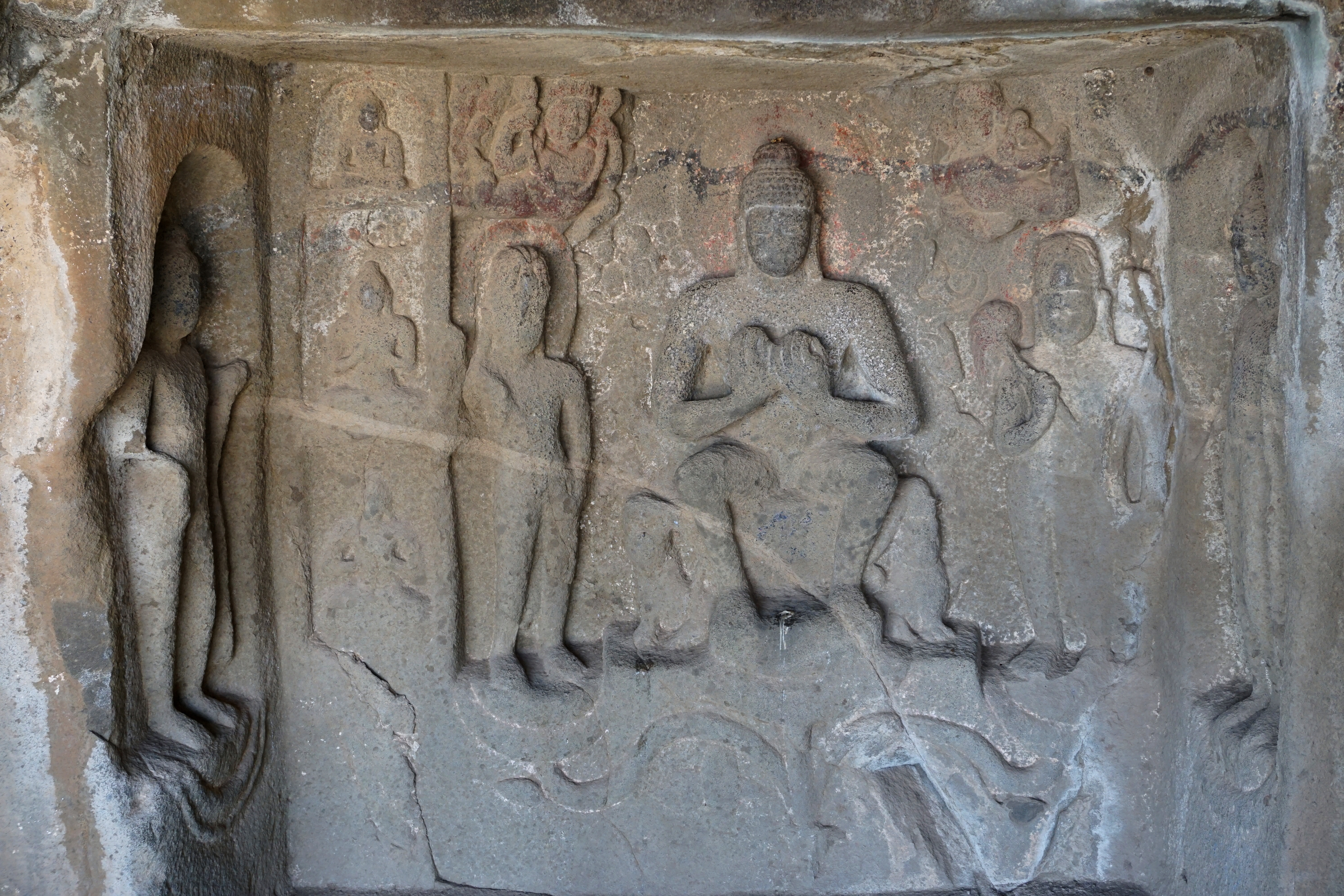
Interior

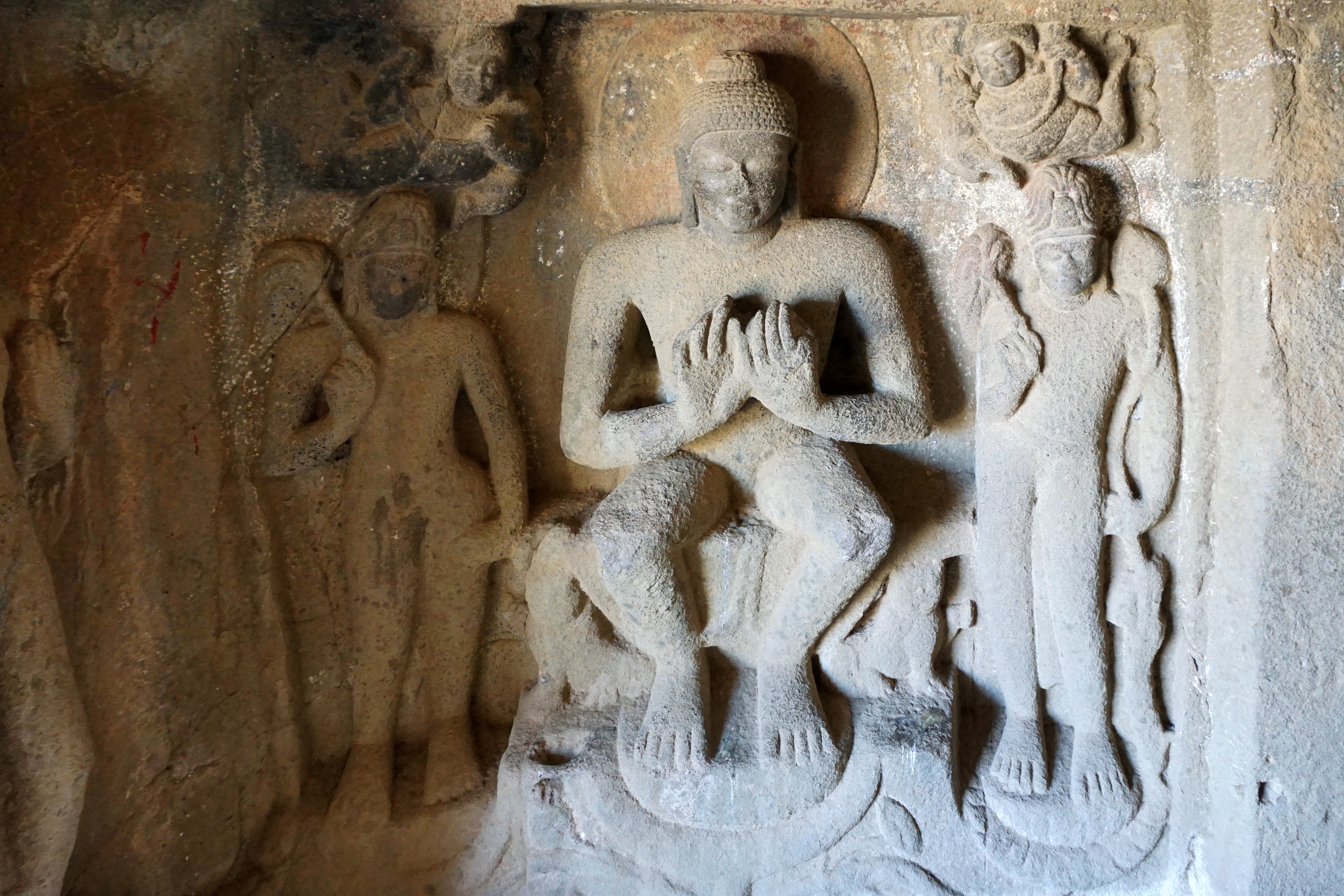
Interior

=== Cave No.3, "Gautamiputra vihara" (circa 150 CE) ===
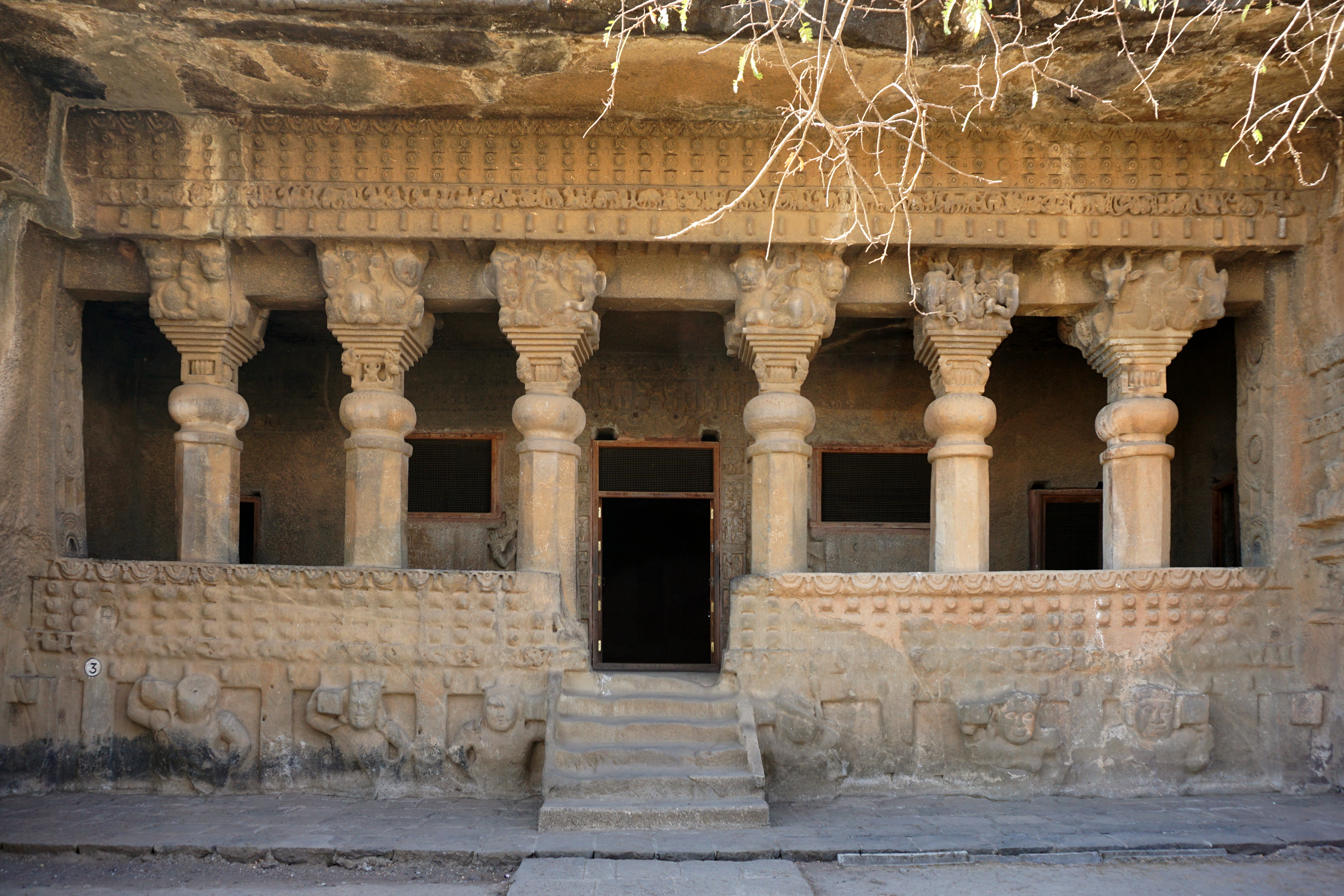
Cave No.3 "Gautamiputra vihara" (circa 150 CE). 3D Tour.

Cave No.3 at Nasik is one of the most important caves, and the largest, of the Pandavleni caves complex. It was built and dedicated to the sangha in the 2nd century CE by Queen Gotami Balasiri, mother of deceased Satavahana king Gautamiputra Satakarni, and contains many important inscriptions.

==== The cave ====
The cave is a vihara meant to provide shelter to Buddhist monks. It is, with cave No.10, the largest vihara cave in the Pandavleni Caves complex. The hall is 41 feet wide and 46 deep, with a bench round three sides. The cave has six pillars on the front porch, roughly similar to those of the early cave No. 10 built by the viceroy of Nahapana circa 120 CE. Inside, 18 monk cells are laid out according to a square plan, seven on the right side, six in the back, and five in the left.

Entrance

The central door into this vihara is sculptured in a style reminiscent of the Sanchi gateways; the side pilasters are divided into six compartments, each filled mostly with two men and a woman, in different stages of some story which seems to end in the woman being carried off by one of the men.
Over the door are the three symbols, the Bodhi tree, the dagoba, and the chakra wheel with worshipers; at each side is a dvarapala or doorkeeper, holding up a bunch of flowers. If the carving on this door be compared with any of those at Ajanta, it may be found more crude and less bold, but the style of headdress agrees with that on the screen walls at Karle, Kanheri, and in the paintings in Cave X at Ajanta, which probably belong to about the same age.

Cave No.3, Entrance gate details
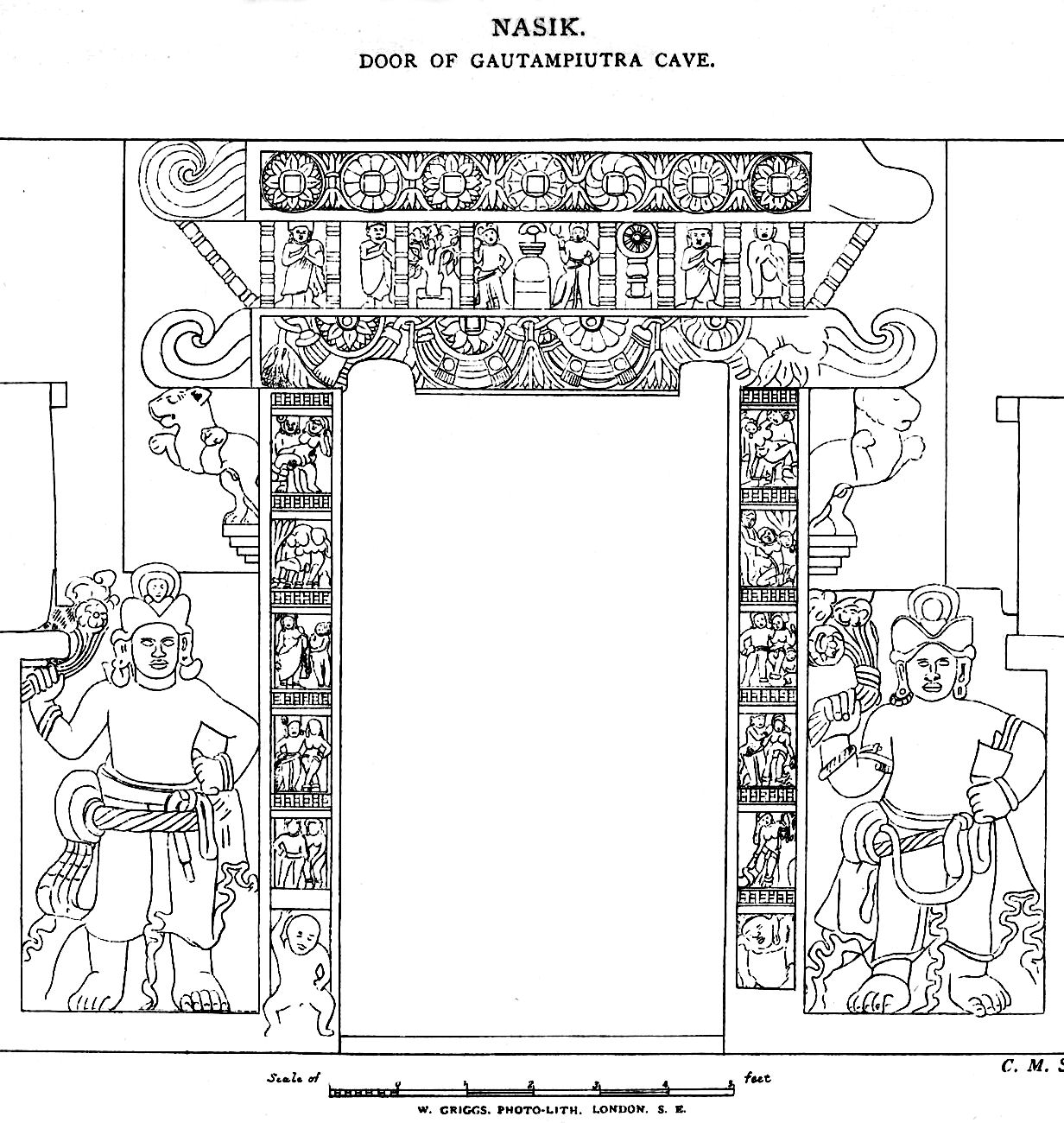
General layout, reminding of a Sanchi gateway.

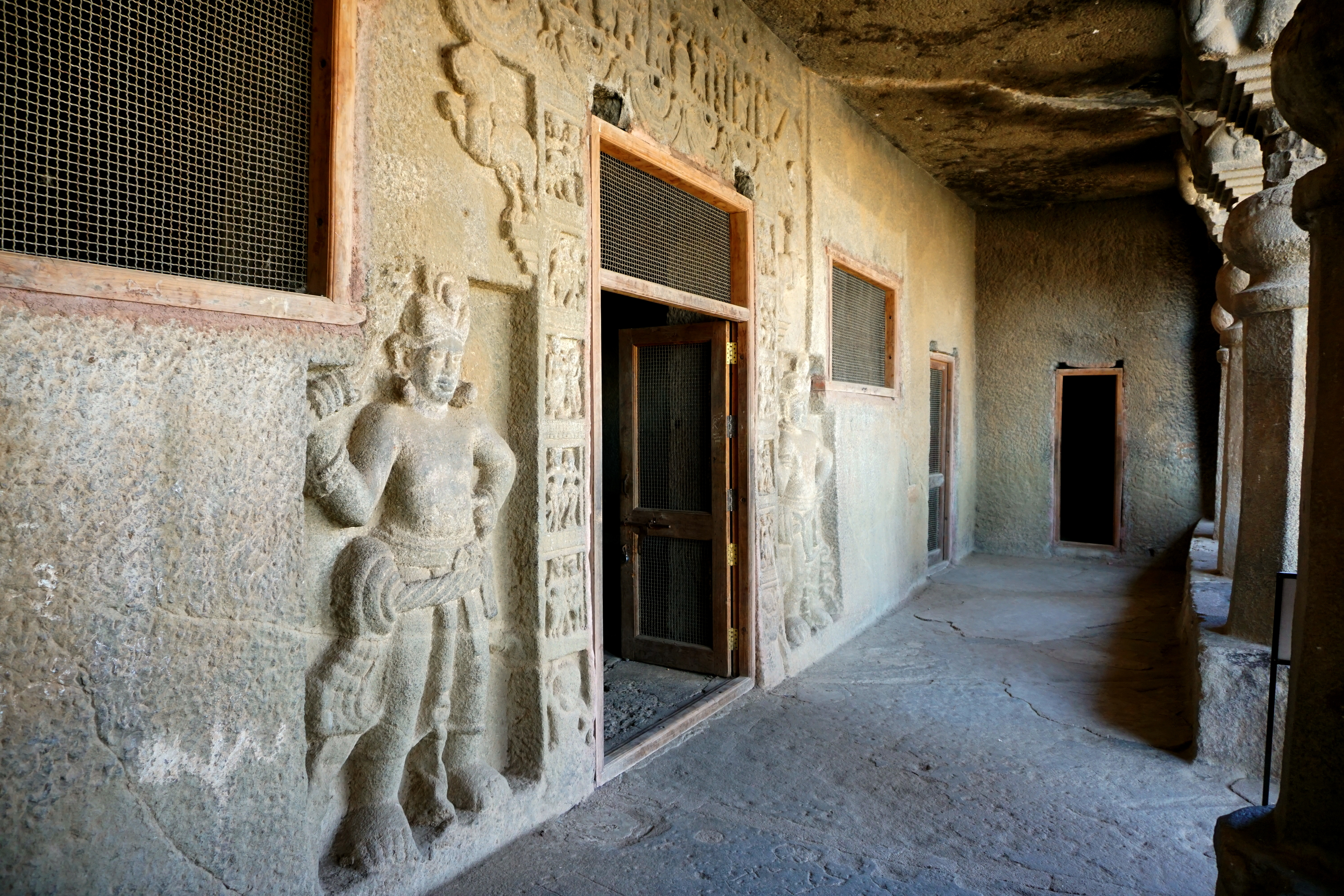
Side view

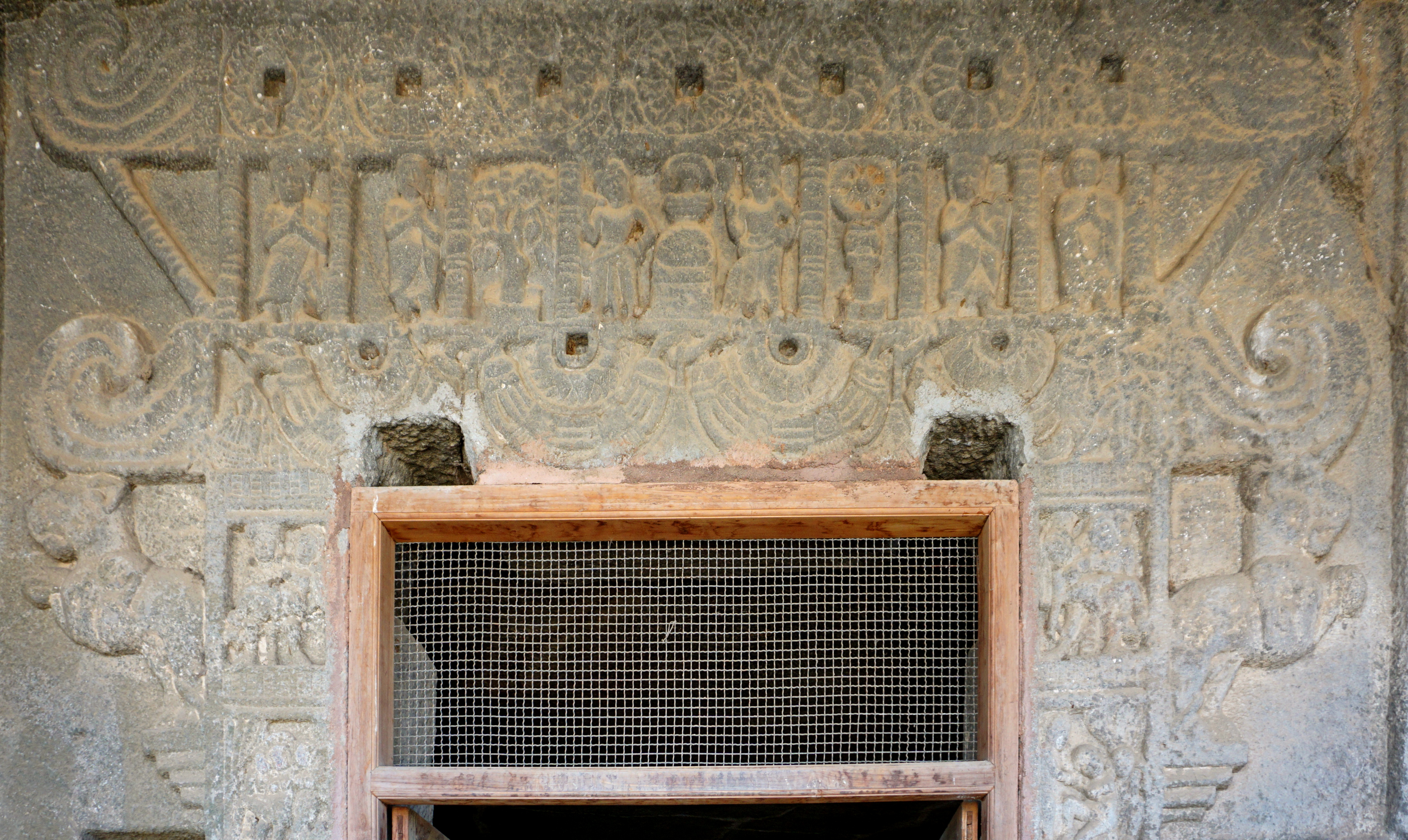
Door frame

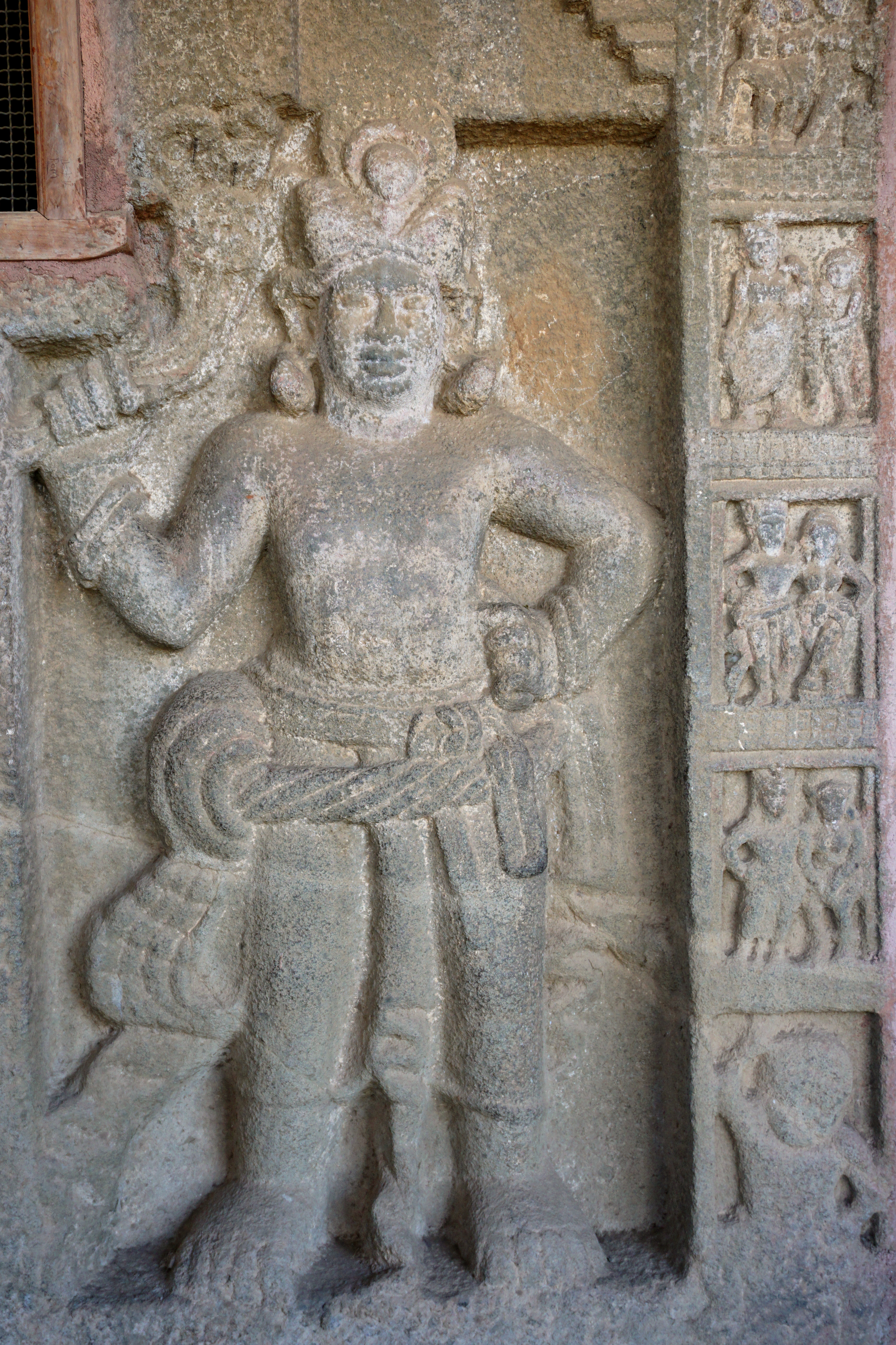
Left Dvarapala

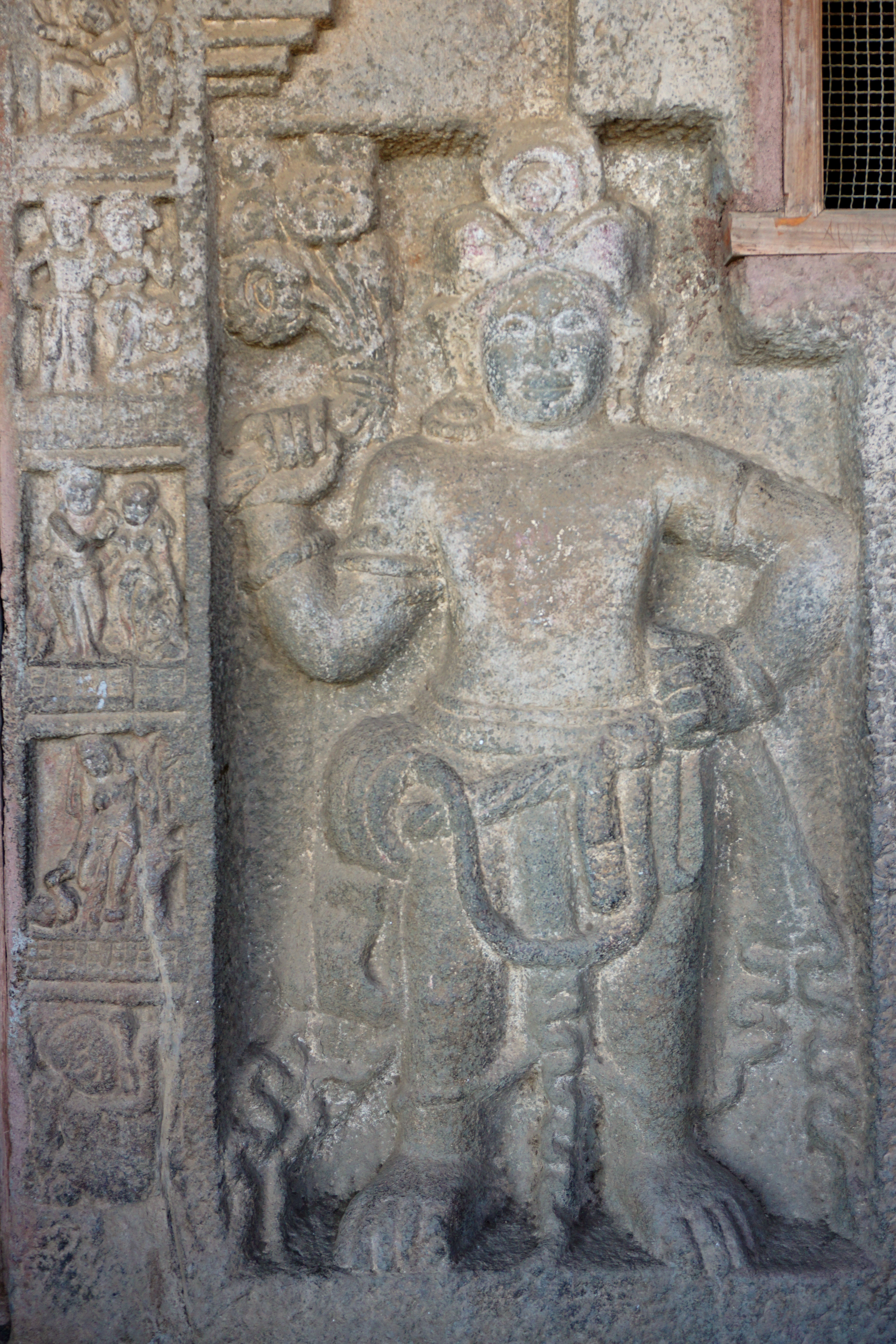
Right Dvarapala

Pillars

Pillars of cave No.3
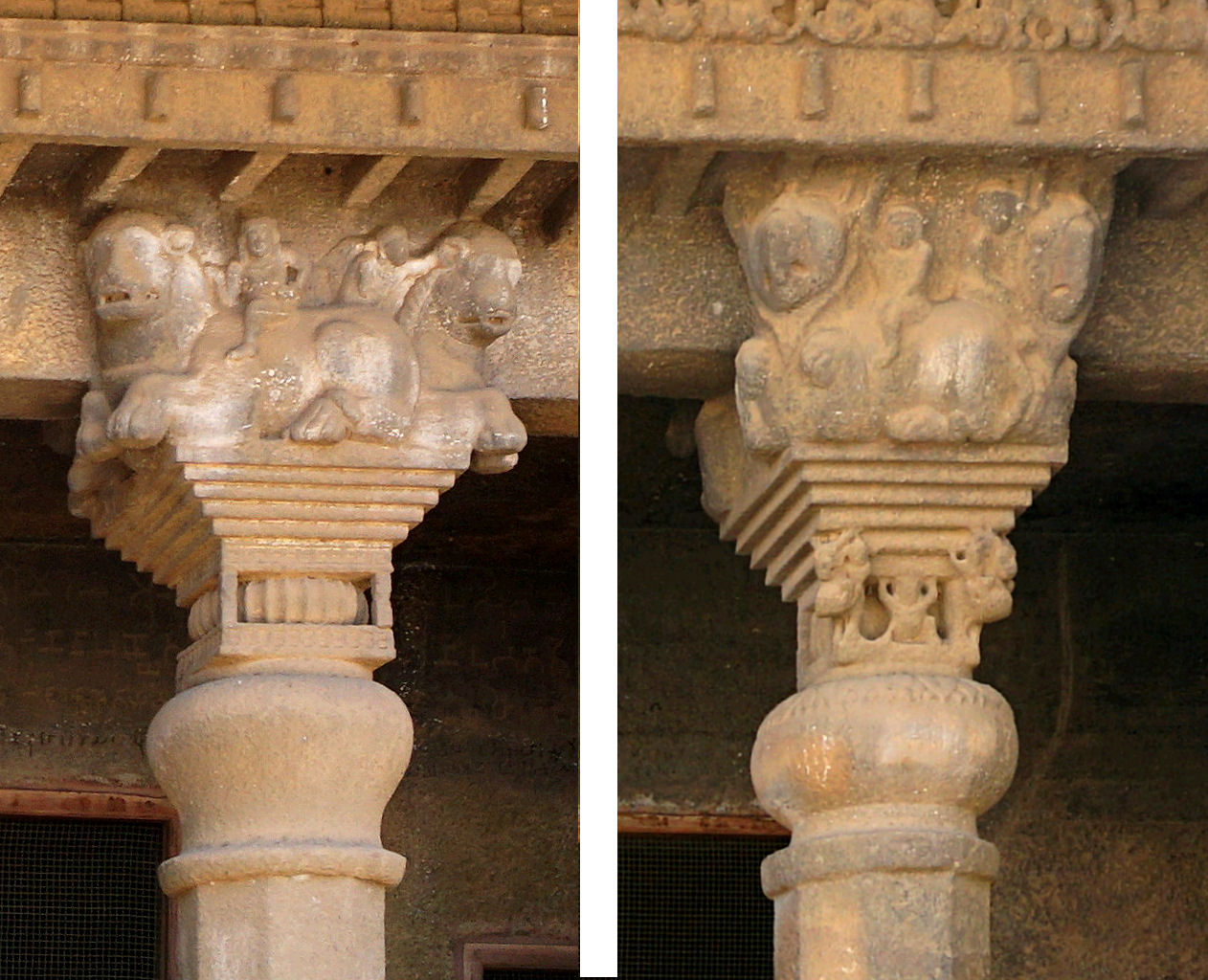
Comparison of the pillar capitals of Nahapana's Cave 10 (left) and Gautamiputra's Cave 3 (right). The capitals of Cave No.3 are "much poorer in proportion", with a "shorter and less elegant form of the bell-shaped portion, and the corners of the frame that encloses the torus having small figures attached", pointing to a later period imitation.

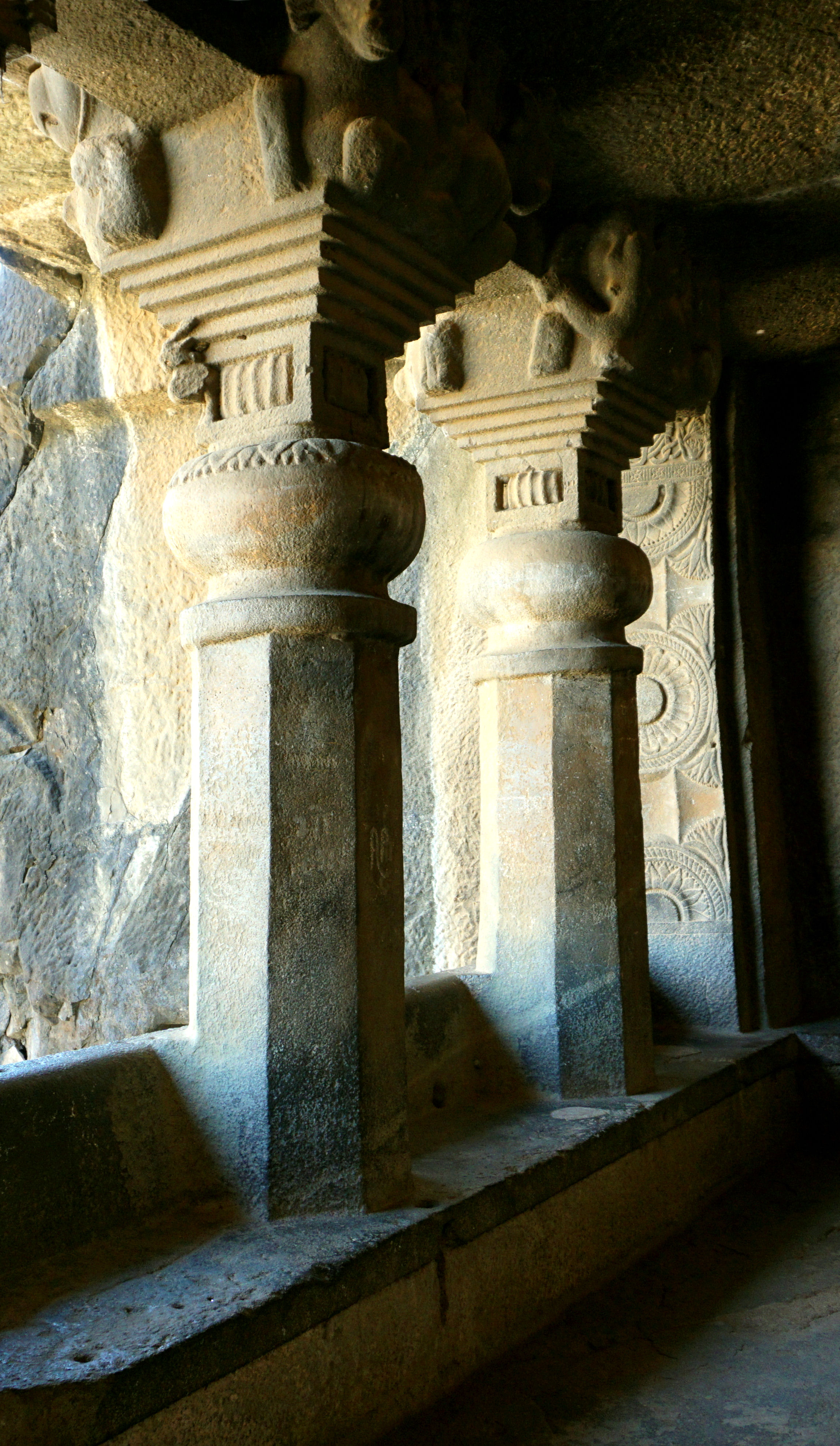
Cave No.3 pillars (back view). They have no base, and "stand on a bench in the veranda, and in front of them is a carved screen".

The veranda has six octagonal columns without bases between highly sculptured pilasters. The capitals of these pillars are distinguished from those in the Nahapana Cave No. 10 by the shorter and less elegant form of the bell-shaped portion of them, and by the corners of the frame that encloses the torus having small figures attached; both alike have a series of five thin members, overlapping one another and supporting four animals on each capital, bullocks, elephants, horses, sphinxes, etc..., between the front and back pairs of which runs the architrave, supporting a projecting frieze, with all the details of a wooden framing copied in it. The upper part of the frieze in this case is richly carved with a string course of animals under a richly carved rail, resembling in its design and elaborateness the rails at Amravati, with which this vihara must be nearly, if not quite contemporary. The pillars stand on a bench in the veranda, and in front of them is a carved screen, supported by three dwarfs on each side the steps to the entrance.
The details of this cave and No. 10 are so alike that the one must be regarded as a copy of the other, but the capitals in No. 10 are so like those of the Karla Caves' chaitya, while those in the veranda of this cave are so much poorer in proportion, that one is tempted to suppose this belongs to a later period, when art had begun to decay.

Comparison with other sites

The architecture of the Nahapana cave (Cave No.10) is very similar to that of the Karla Caves Great Chaitya. Conversely, the architecture of cave No. 3 is very similar to that of the Kanheri Chaitya. This suggests that the two viharas cannot be very far apart in date from the two chaitya halls.

Cave No.3, "Gautamiputra Vihara" (reign of Sri Pulumavi)
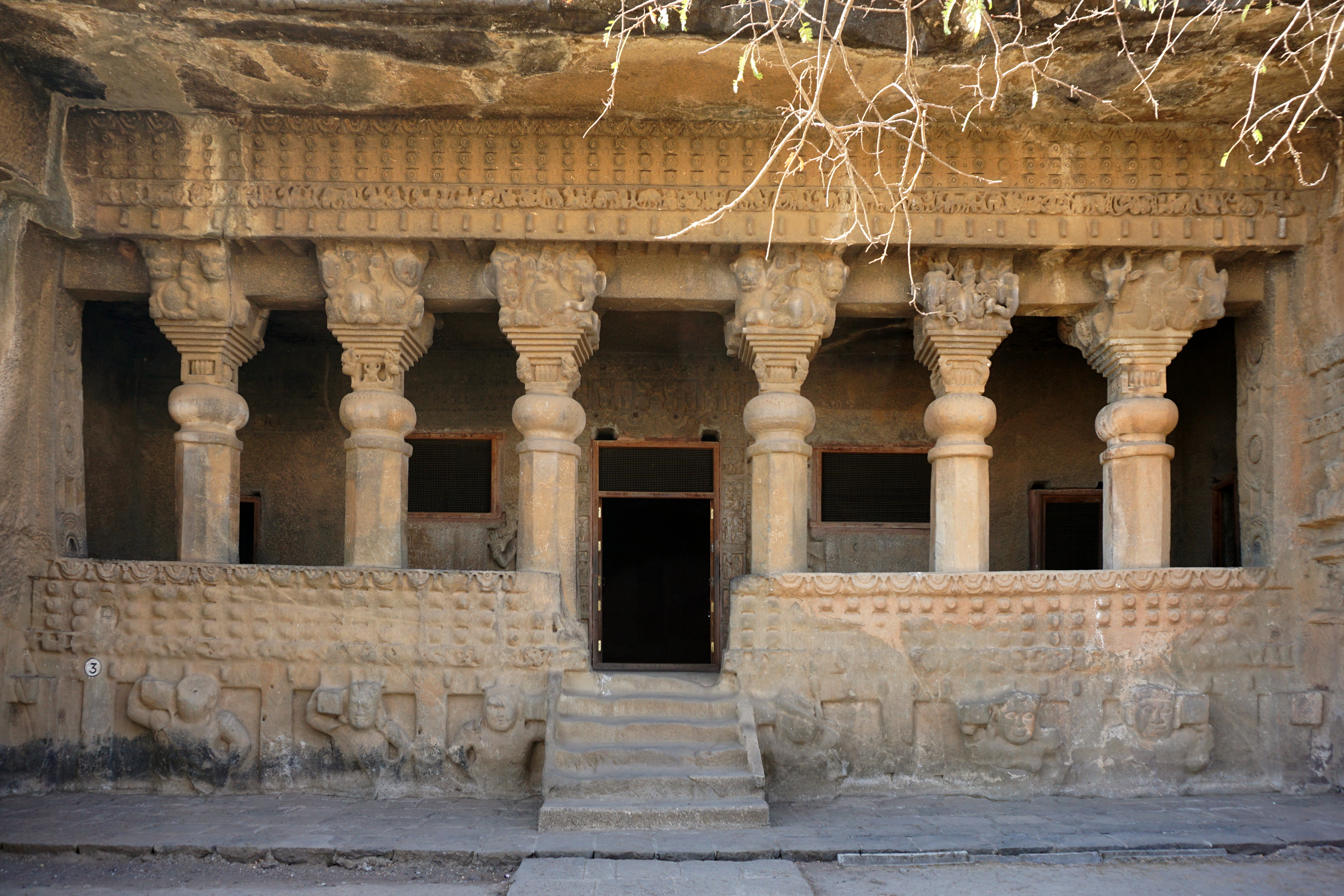
Cave 3, exterior

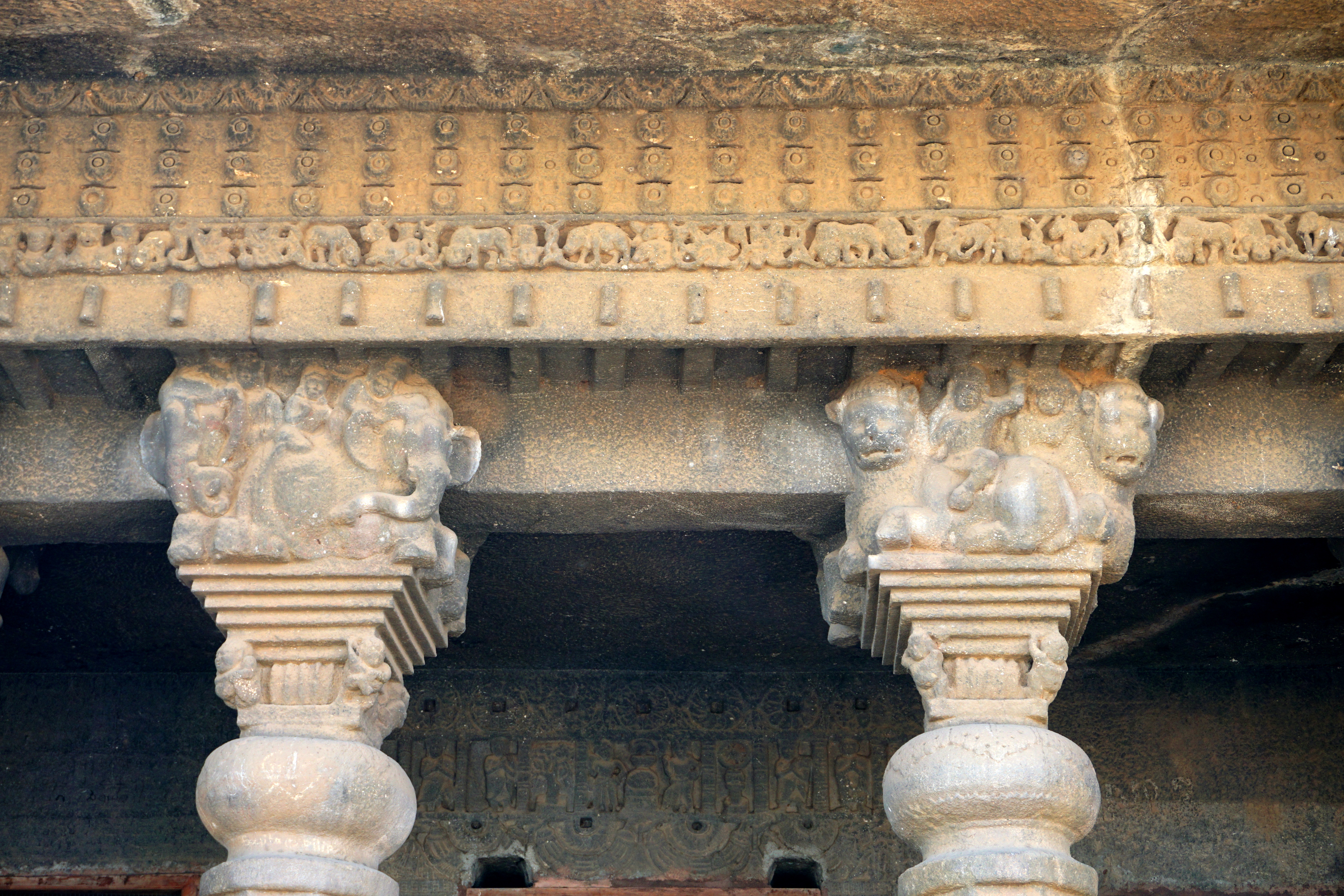
Cave 3, pillars

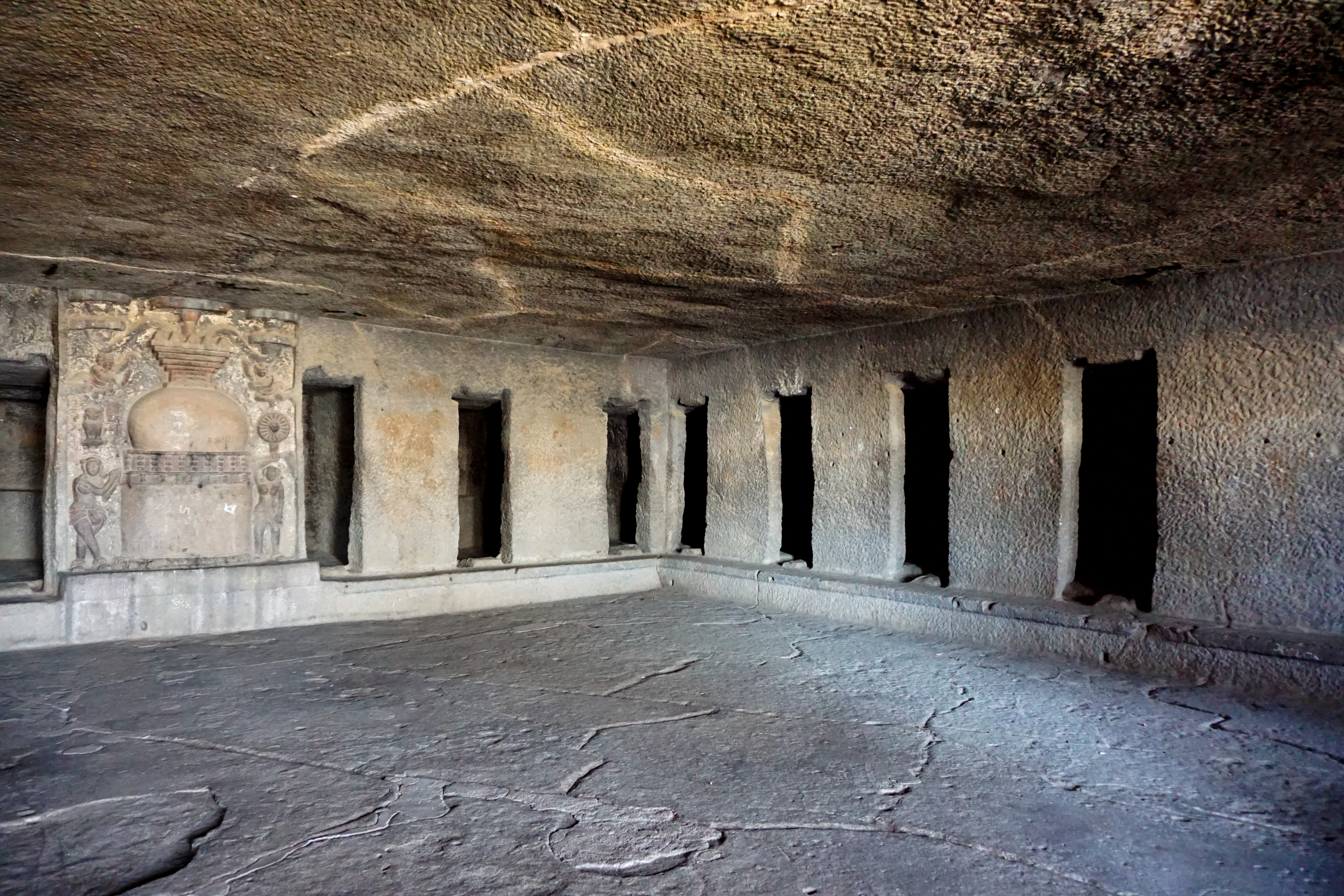
Interior

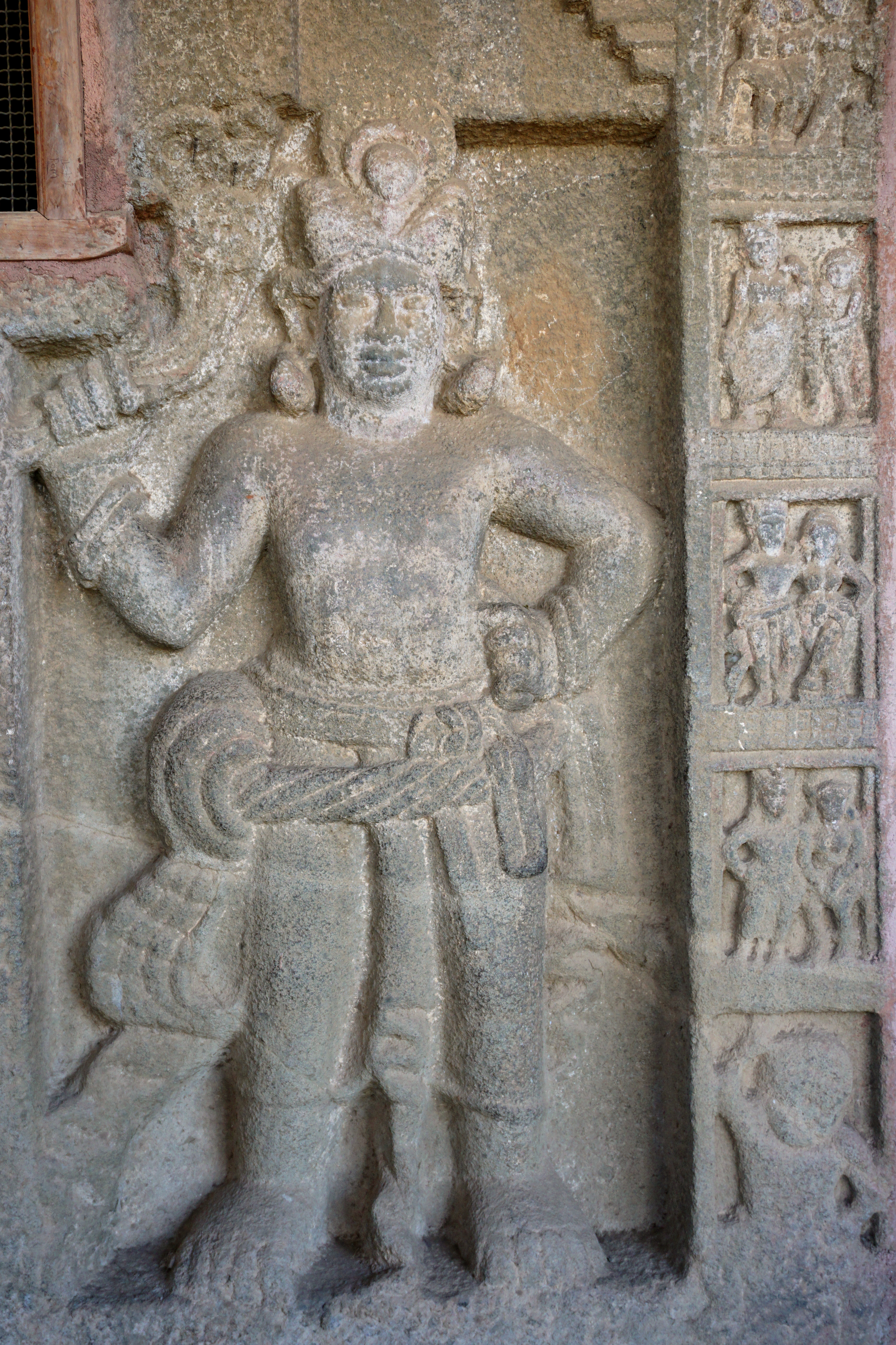
Dvarapala

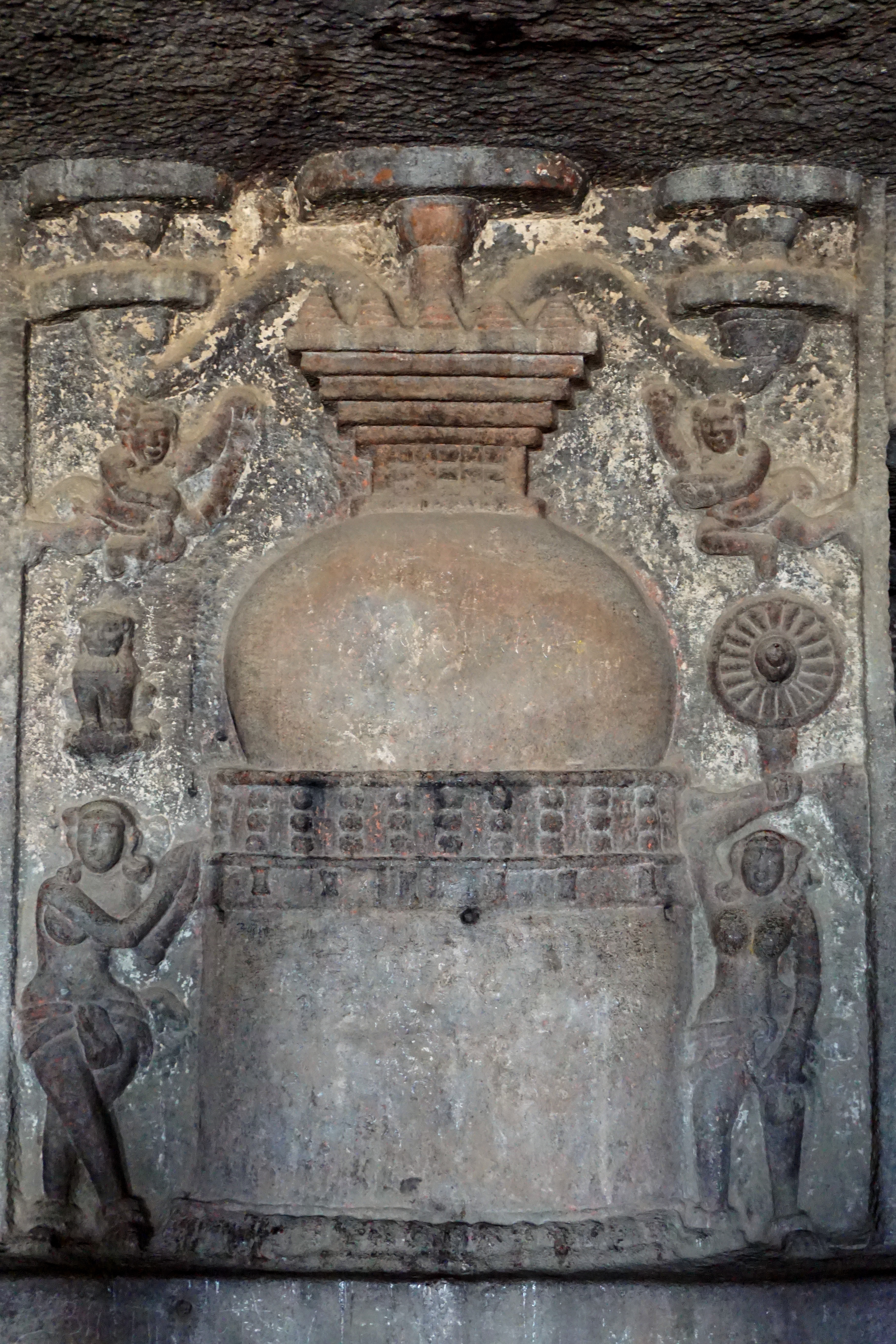
Chaitya relief
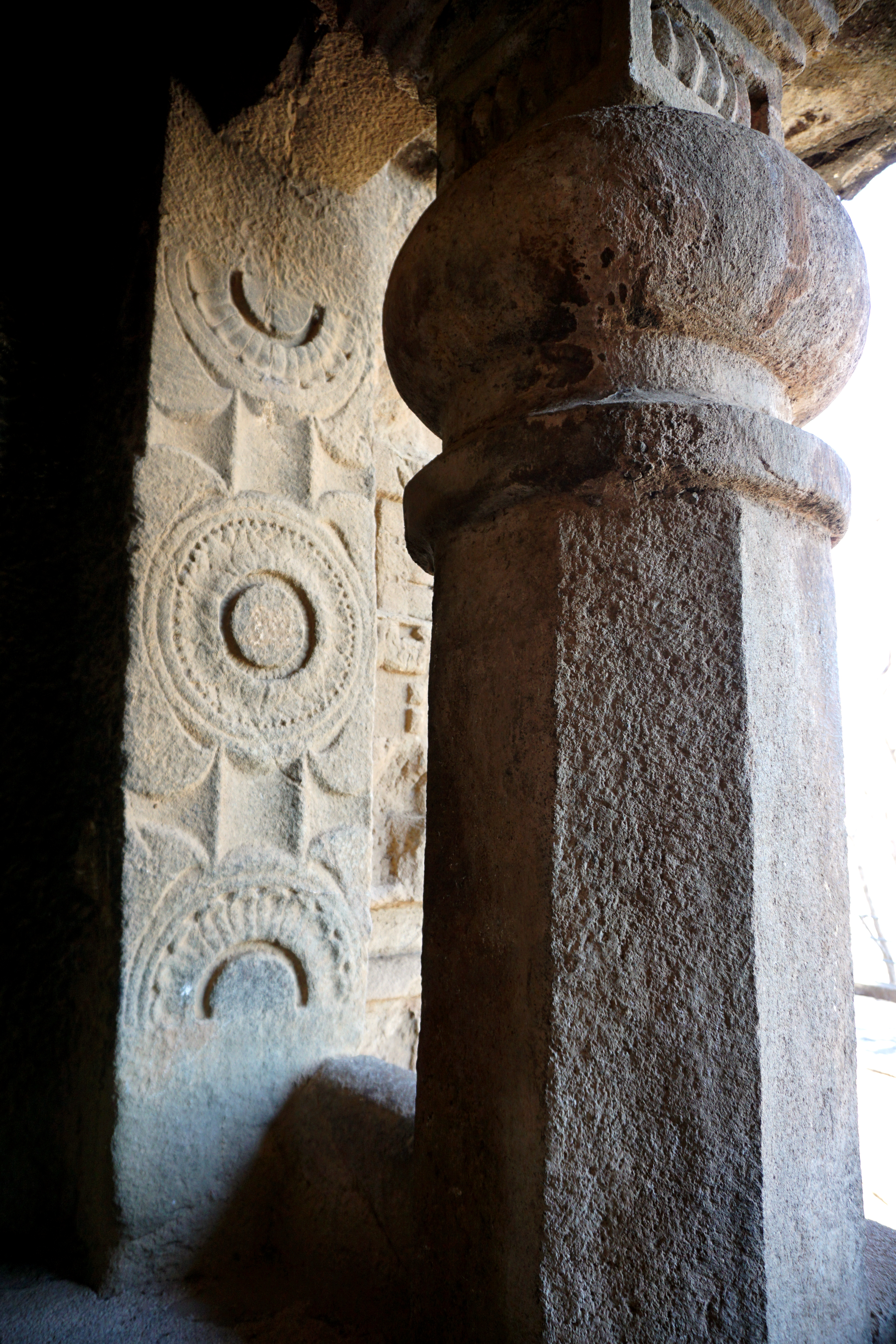
Decoration

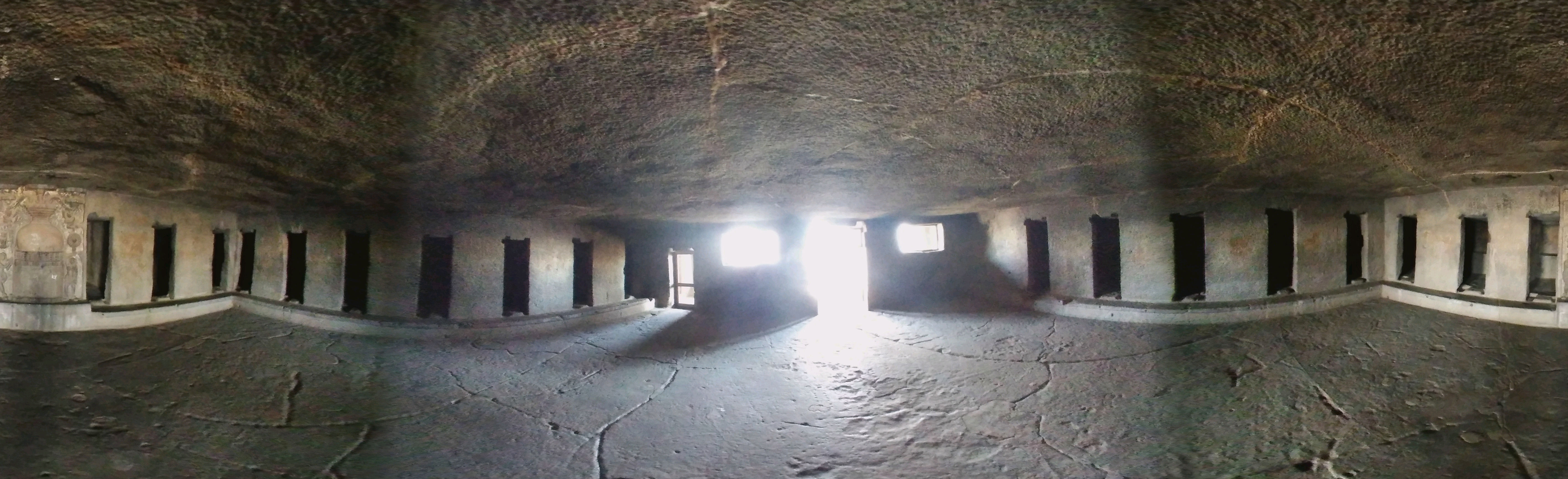
Interior panorama

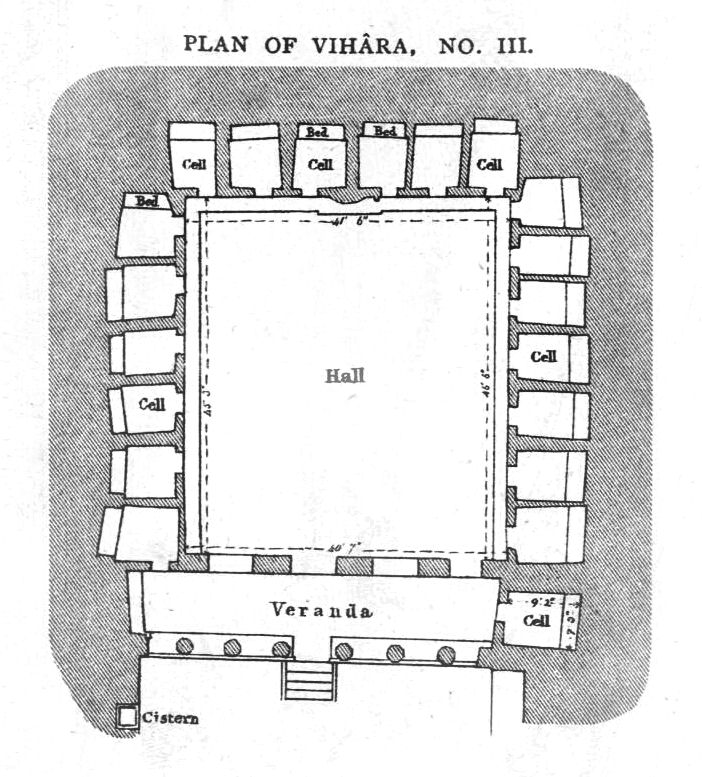
Plan of the vihara

==== Inscriptions ====
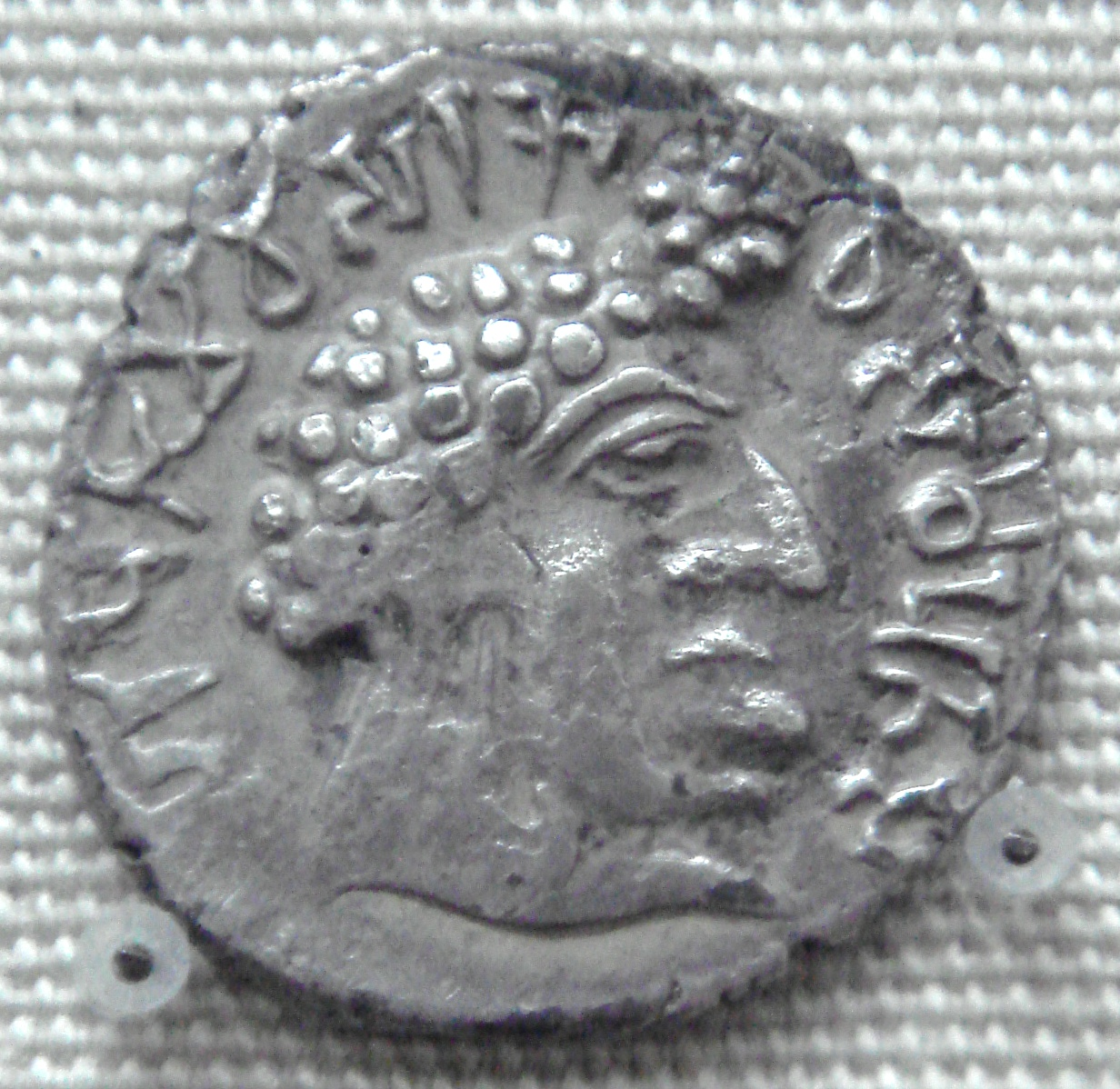
Cave No.3 was completed and dedicated to the Samgha during the reign of Satavahana king Vasishthiputra Pulumavi (130–159 CE).

One long inscription (No. 2) in the 19th year of Satavahana king Sri Pulumavi (2nd century CE), explains that Queen Gotami Balasiri, mother of glorious king Gotamiputra, caused this cave to be built and gave it to the sangha. There is also another long inscription (No.3) by Sri Pulumavi himself, also in the 22nd year of his reign. There are also inscriptions (No. 4 and No. 5) at the entrance of the cave by Gautamiputra Satakarni (2nd century) in the 18th year of his reign, who claims a great victory.

As mentioned above, one of the most important Nasik Caves inscription was made by Gautamiputra's mother the great queen Gotami Balasiri, during the reign of her grandson Vasishthiputra Pulumavi, in order to record the gift of Cave No.3. The full inscription consists in a long eulogy of Gautamiputra Satakarni, mentioning his valour, his military victories, and then her gift of a cave in the Nasik Caves complex.

The most important passages on this inscription related to the military victories of Gautamiputra Satakarni, in particular:

- the claim that Gautamiputra Satakarni "destroyed the Sakas, Yavanas and Palhavas", alluding respectively to the Western Satraps, the Indo-Greeks and the Indo-Parthians
- the claim that Gautamitra Satakarni "rooted out the Khakharata race" and "restored the glory of the Satavahana family". The Khakharata refers to the Kshaharata dynasty, the family branch of Nahapana, the important Western Satraps ruler.

The full inscription, located on the back wall of the veranda above the entrance, reads:

Inscription of Queen Gotami Balasiri
Nasik Cave No.3, inscription No.2, 19th year of the reign of Sri Pulumavi
(back wall of the veranda, above the left window of the entrance)

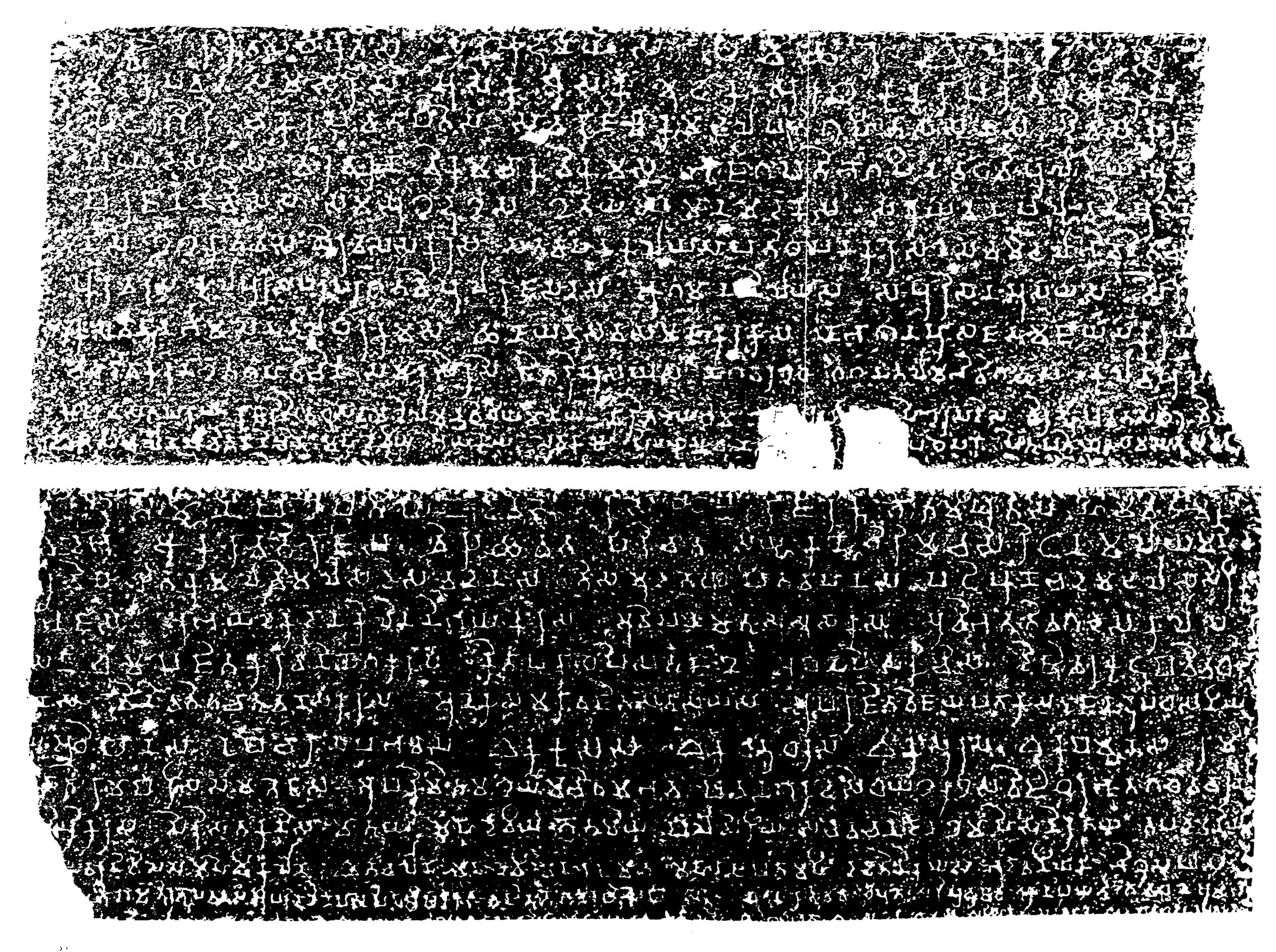
Full inscription of Queen Gotami Balasiri (rubbing).

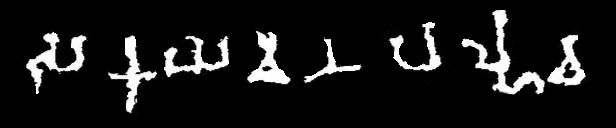
The defeated "Saka-Yavana-Palhava" (Brahmi script: 𑀲𑀓 𑀬𑀯𑀦 𑀧𑀮𑁆𑀳𑀯) mentioned in the Nasik cave 3 inscription of Queen Gotami Balasiri (end of line 5 of the inscription).

"Success! In the nineteenth -19th- year of king Siri-Pulumayi Vasithiputra, in the second -2nd- fortnight of summer, on the thirteenth -13th- day, the great queen Gotami Balasiri, delighting in truth, charity, patience and respect for life; bent on penance, self-control, restraint and abstinence; fully working out the type of a royal Rishi's wife; the mother of the king of kings, Siri-Satakani Gotamiputa,

- who was in strength equal to mount Himavat, mount Meru, mount Mandara; king of Asika, Asaka, Mulaka, Suratha, Kukura, Aparanta, Anupa, Vidabha, Akaravanti; lord of the mountains Vindhya, Chhavata, Parichata, Sahya, Kanhagiri, Macha, Siritana, Malaya, Mahendra, Setagiri, Chakora; obeyed by the circle of all kings on earth;
- whose face was beautiful and pure like the lotas opened by the rays of the sun; whose chargers had drunk the water of three oceans; whose face was lovely and radiant like the orb of the full moon; whose gait was beautiful like the gait of a choice elephant; whose arms were as muscular and rounded, broad and long as the folds of the lord of serpents; whose fearless hand was wet by the water poured out to impart fearlessness; of unchecked obedience towards his mother; who properly devised time and place for the pursuit of the triple object (of human activity); who sympathized fully with the weal and woe of the citizens;
- who crushed down the pride and conceit of the Kshatriyas; who destroyed the Sakas, Yavanas and Palhavas; who never levied nor employed taxes but in conformity to justice; alien to hurting life even towards an offending enemy; the furtherer of the homesteads of the low as well as of the twice-born; who rooted out the Khakharata race; who restored the glory of the Satavahana family; whose feet were saluted by all provinces; who stopped the contamination of the four varnas; who conquered multitudes of enemies in many battles; whose victorious banner was unvanquished; whose capital was unassailable to his foes;
- who had inherited from a long line of ancestors the privilege of kingly music; the abode of traditional lore; the refuge of the virtuous; the asylum of Fortune; the fountain of good manners; the unique controller; the unique archer; the unique hero; the unique Brahmana; in prowess equal to Kama, Kesava, Arjuna and Bhimasena; liberal on festive days in unceasing festivities and assemblies; not inferior in lustre to Nabhaga, Nahusha, Janamejaya, Sagara, Yayati, Rama and Ambartsha; who, vanquishing his enemies in a way as constant as inexhaustible, unthinkable and marvelous; in battles fought by the Wind, Garuda, the Siddbas, the Yakshas, the Rakshasas, the Vidyadharas, the Bhutas, the Gandharvas, the Charanas, the Moon, the Son, the Asterisms and the Planets, (appeared to be himself) plunging into the sky from the shoulder of his choice elephant; (and) who (thus) raised his family to high fortune,

caused, as a pious gift, on the top of the Tiranhu mountain similar to the top of the Kailasa, (this) cave to be made quite equal to the divine mansions (there). And that cave the great queen, mother of a Maharaja and grandmother of a Maharaja, gives to the Sangha of monks in the person of the fraternity of the Bhadavaniyas; and for the sake of the embellishment of that cave, with a view to honour and please the great queen his grandmother, her grandson lord of [Dakshina]patha, making over the merit of the gift to his father, grants to this meritorious donation (vis. the cave) the village Pisajipadaka on the south-west side of mount Tiranhu.
Renunciation to the enjoyments of every kind."

— Nasik Caves inscription of Queen Gotami Balasiri, Cave No.3

The above inscription shows an odd but fascinating blend of Vedic-Bramanic beliefs, religious and cultural, in mentioning caste (the "twice born" Brahmins and the "varnas," or Four Castes) and characters from the Mahabharata (Arjuna, Bhima) and Puranas (Nahusha), while also espousing beliefs in Buddhism ("Renunciation to the enjoyments of every kind," "..this meritorious donation") and openly supporting the sangha. Despite the eventual antagonism between Buddhists and Brahmins over royal patronage, the Satavahanas clearly supported both religious groups, perhaps trying to curry favor not only with the humans but also the divinities.

The next inscription is located right under the inscription of the Queen, only separated by a swastika and another symbol. The inscription (inscription No.3) was made by Sri Pulumavi himself, in the 22nd year of his reign, and records the gift of a village for the welfare of the monks dwelling in the cave built by his grandmother.

Inscription of Sri-Pulumavi
Nasik Cave No.3, inscription No.3 (reign of Sri Pulumavi)

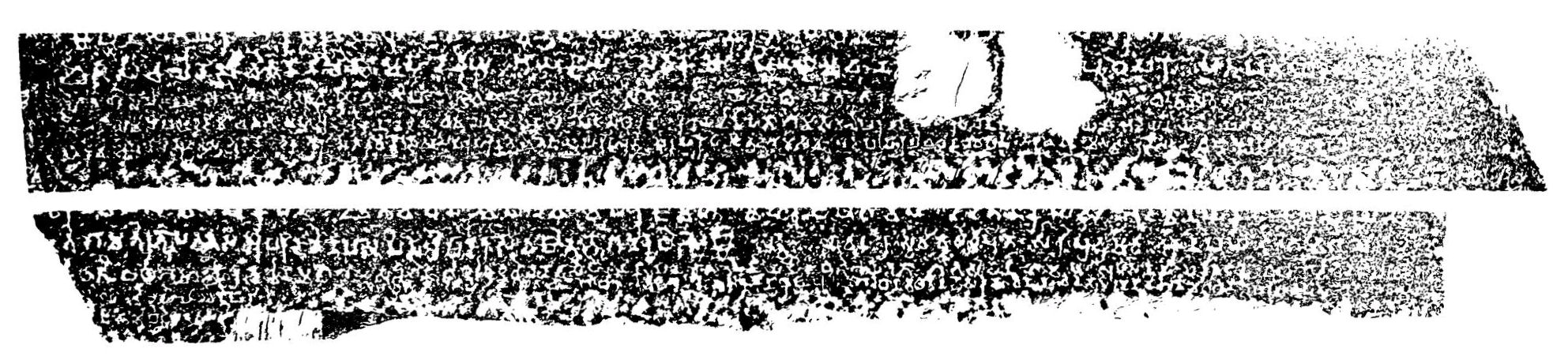
Inscription of Sri-Pulumavi, Nasik cave No.3.

" Success ! The lord of Navanara, Siri-Pulumavi Vasithiputa, commands Sivakhandila, the officer at Govadhana: The village of Sudisana here in the Govadhana district on the Southern road, which by us, in the 19th year, on the 13th day of the 2nd fortnight of summer, . . . . by the Samanas of Dhanamkata who [dwell] here on mount Tiranhu ......, has been given to be owned by the Bhikshus of that fraternity, the Bhadayaniyas dwelling in the Queen's Cave, to produce a perpetual rent for the care of the cave meritoriously excavated, - in exchange for this gift, -the village of Sudasana,- we give the village of Samalipada, here in the Govadhana district on the Eastern road; and this village of Samalipada, .......by the Maha-Aryaka, you must deliver to be owned by the Bhikshus of the school of the Bhadayaniyas dwelling in the Queen's Cave, to produce a perpetual rent for the care of the cave meritoriously excavated; and to this village of Samalipada we grant the immunity belonging to monk's land, (making it) not to be entered (by royal officers), not to be touched (by any of them), not to be dug for salt, not to be interfered with by the district police, (in short) to enjoy all kinds of immunities. With all these immunities you must invest it; and this donation of the village of Samalipada and the immunities take care to have registered here at Sudasana. And by the (officers) entrusted with the abrogation of the (previous) donation of the Sudasana village it has been ordered. Written by the Mahdsendpati Medhnna ....., kept (?) by the ....... of deeds (?). The deed was delivered in the year 22, the 7th day of the . . fortnight of summer; executed by .... . (?). With a view for the well-being of the inhabitants of Govadhana, Vinhupala proclaims the praise of the Lord: Obeisance to the Being exalted in perfection and majesty, the excellent Jina, the Buddha."

— Nasik Caves inscription of Sri-Pulumavi, Cave No.3

The next inscription of the cave is very important in that it seems to record the appropriation by king Gautamiputra Satakarni of a land previously owned by Nahapana's viceroy Usubhadata, builder of Cave No.10, thereby confirming the capture of territory by the Satavahanas over the Western Satraps. Since his mother made the final dedication of the cave during the reign of his son (inscription No.2 above), Gautamiputra Satakarni may have started the cave, but not finished it. The inscription is on the east wall of the veranda in Cave No. 3, under the ceiling.

Inscription of Gautamiputra Satakarni, year 18
Nasik Cave No.3, inscription No.4

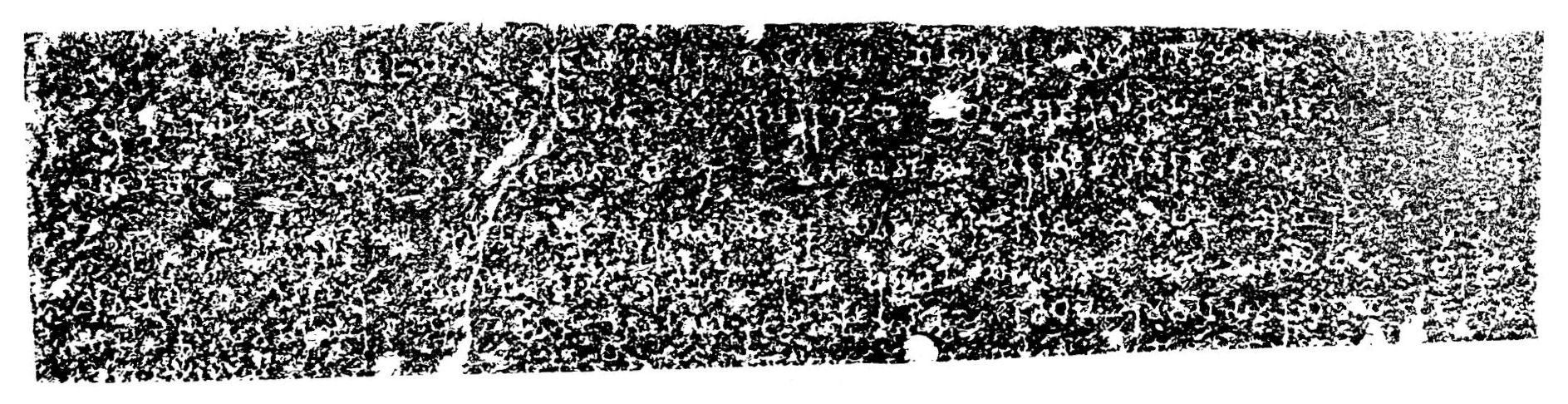
Inscription of Gautamiputra Satakarni, Cave No.3, Inscription No.4.

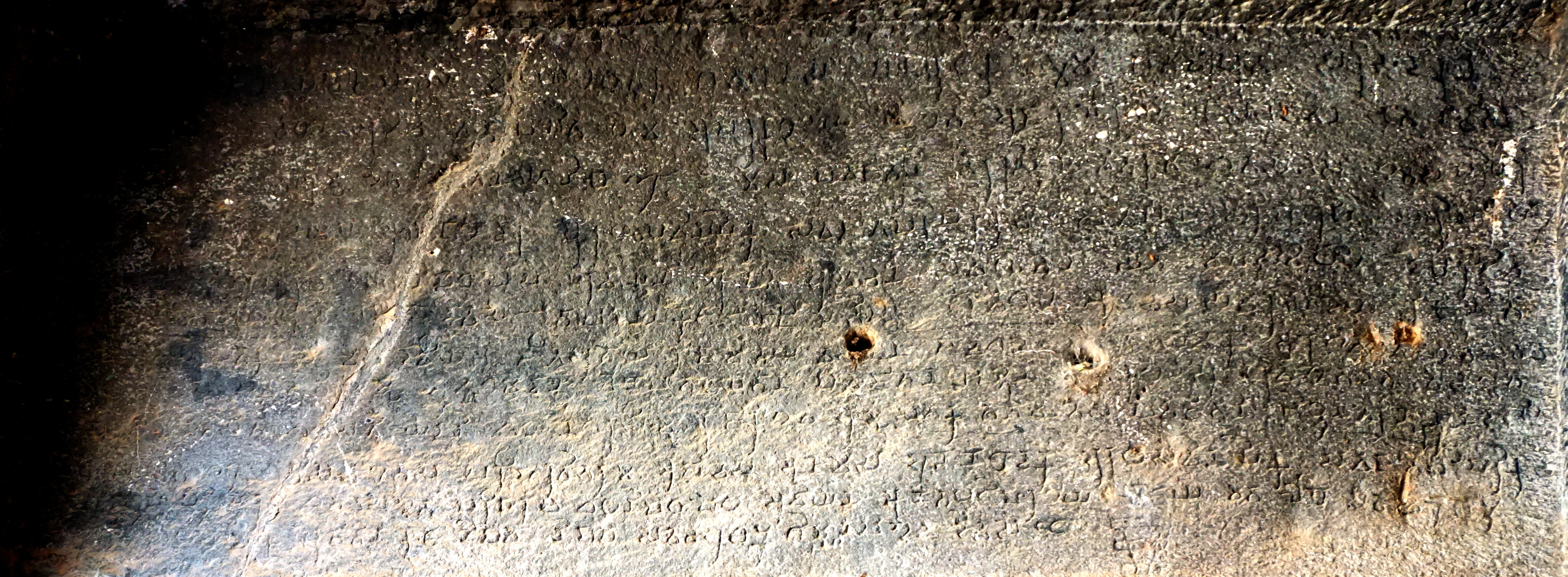
The two inscriptions of Gautamiputra Satakarni, written one after another. Cave No.3, Inscription No.4.

" Success! From the camp of victory of the Vejayanti army, Siri-Sadakani Gotamiputa, lord of Benakataka of Govadhana, commands Vinhupalita, the officer at Govadhana: The Ajakalakiya field in the village of Western Kakhadi, previously enjoyed by Usabhadata, - two hundred - 200 - nivartanas, - that our field - two hundred - 200 - nivartanas - we confer on those Tekirasi ascetics; and to that field we grant immunity, (making it) not to be entered (by royal officers), not to be touched (by any of them), not to be dug for salt, not to be interfered with by the district police, and (in short) to enjoy all kinds of immunities; with those immunities invest it; and this field and these immunities take care to have registered here. Verbally ordered; written down by the officer Sivaguta; kept by the Mahasamiyas. The deed was delivered in the 18th year, on the 1st day of the 2nd fortnight of the rainy season; executed by Tapasa."

— Nasik Caves inscription of Gautamiputra Satakarni, Cave No.3

A final inscription, written as a continuation of the previous one, and only separated by a swastika, describes a correction to the previous inscription, as the donated lands and villages turned to be inappropriate. The inscription reads:

Inscription of Gautamiputra Satakarni, year 24
Nasik Cave No.3, inscription No.5

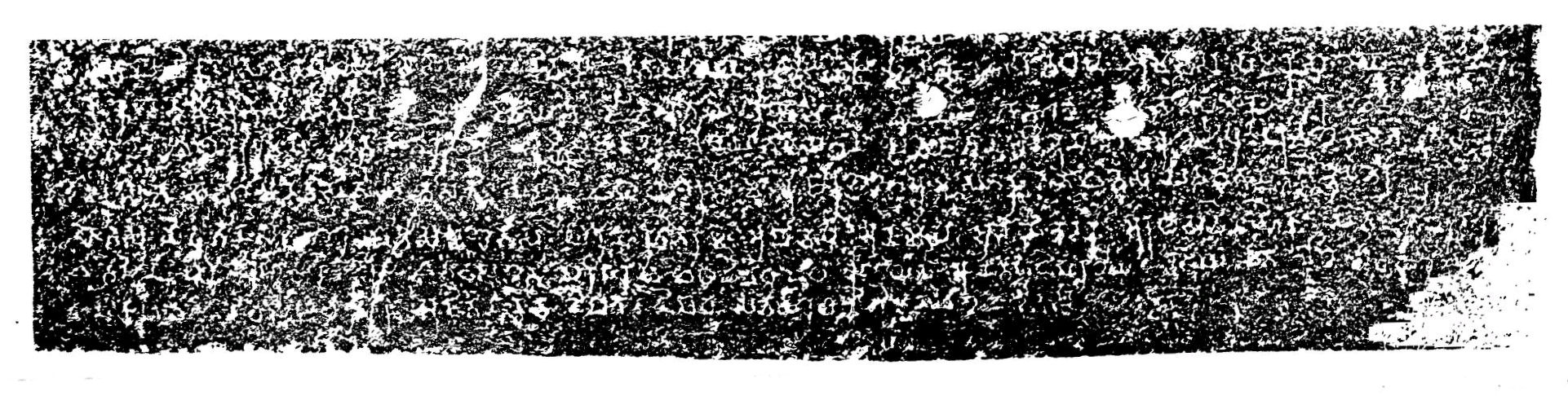
Inscription of Gautamiputra Satakarni, Cave No.3, Inscription No.5.

" Success ! Order of the king, to be made over to Samaka, the officer at Govadhana, In the name of the king Satakani Gotamiputa and of the king's queen mother whose son is living, Samaka, the officer at Govadhana, shall be addressed with the usual civility and then shall be told thus: " We have here on mount Tiranhu formerly given to the mendicant ascetics dwelling in the cave which is a pious gift of ours, a field in the village of Kakhadi; but this field is not tilled, nor is the village inhabited. Matters being so, that royal village of ours, which is now here on the limit of the town, from that field we give to the mendicant ascetics of Tiranhu one hundred -100 - nivartanas of land, and to that field we grant immunity, (making it) not to be entered (by royal officers), not to be touched (by any of them), not to be dug for salt, not to be interfered with by the district police, and (in short) to enjoy ail kinds of immunities; invest it with those immunities, and take care that the donation of the field and the immunities are duly registered." Verbally ordered; the deed written down by Lota, the door-keeper; (the charter) executed by Sujivin in the year 24, in the 4th fortnight of the rainy season, on the fifth -5th- day. The donation had been made in the year 24, in the 2nd fortnight of summer, on the 10th day."

— Nasik Caves inscription of Gautamiputra Satakarni, Cave No.3

=== Caves No.4-9 ===
Cave No.4
Cave No.4 is much destroyed and full of water to a considerable depth. The frieze is at a very considerable height, and is carved with the "rail pattern". The veranda has had two octagonal pillars between antae, with bell-shaped capitals, surmounted by elephants with small drivers and female riders. There has also been a plain doorway and two grated windows leading into the cave, but only the heads of them remain. From the unusual height and the chisel marks in the lower part, apparently recent, it seems as if the floor of this cave had been cut away into a cistern below it. Indeed, when the cave ceased to be used as a monastery, from the breaking through of the floor into the water cistern below, the floor seems to have been quite hewn out to form a cistern. This seems to have been done in many cases here.

There are no inscriptions in this cave.

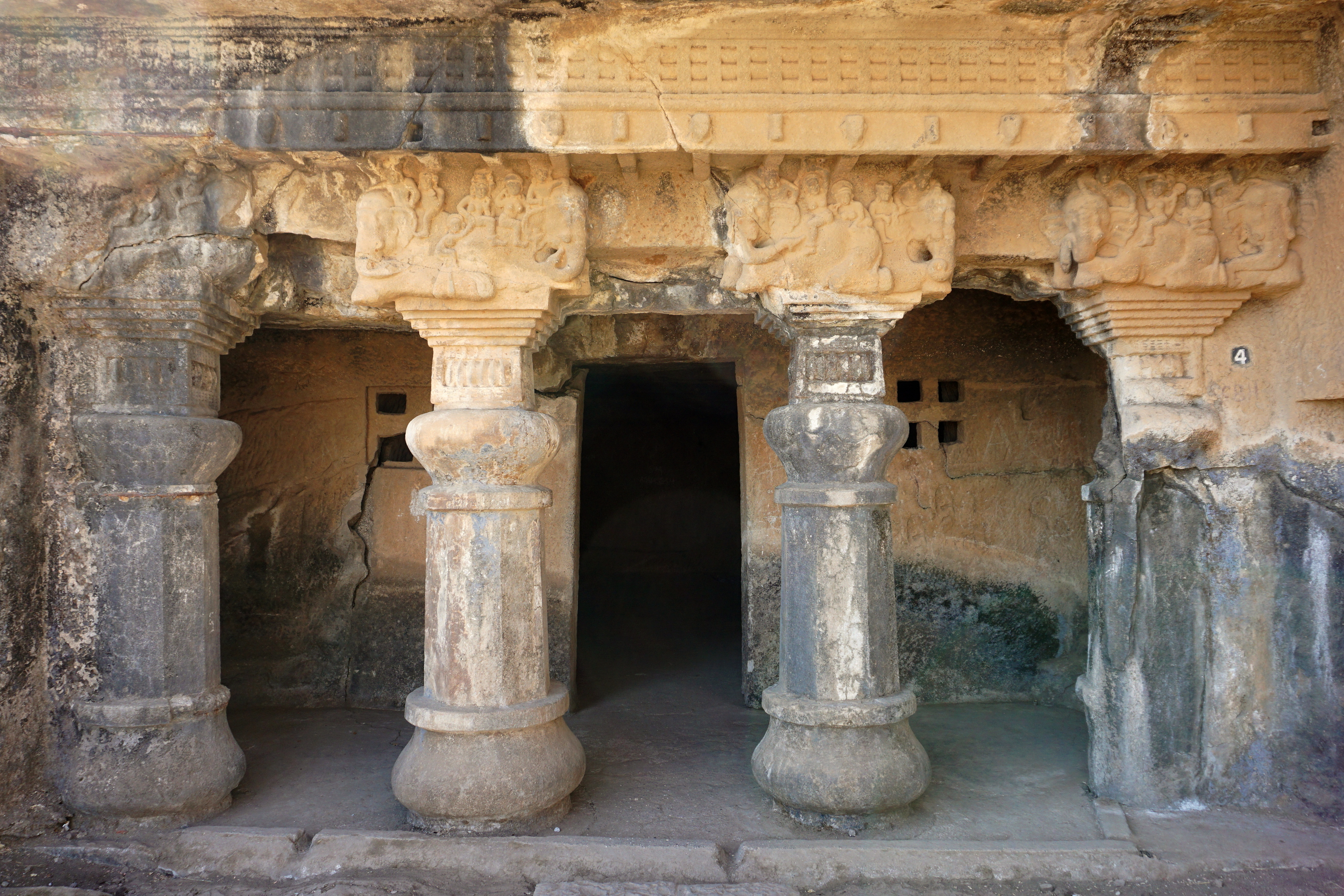
Cave 4, exterior

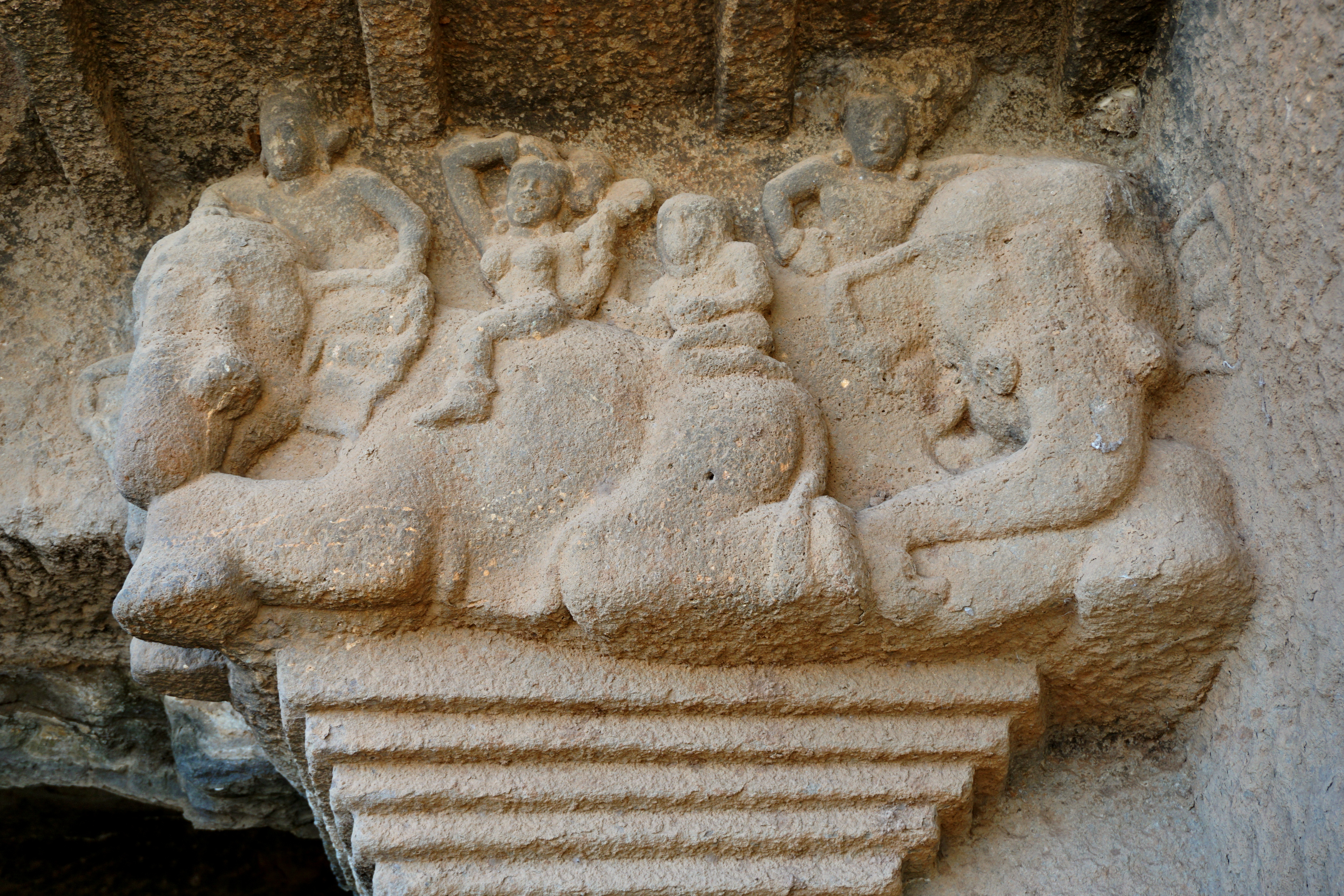
Cave 4, pillar capital

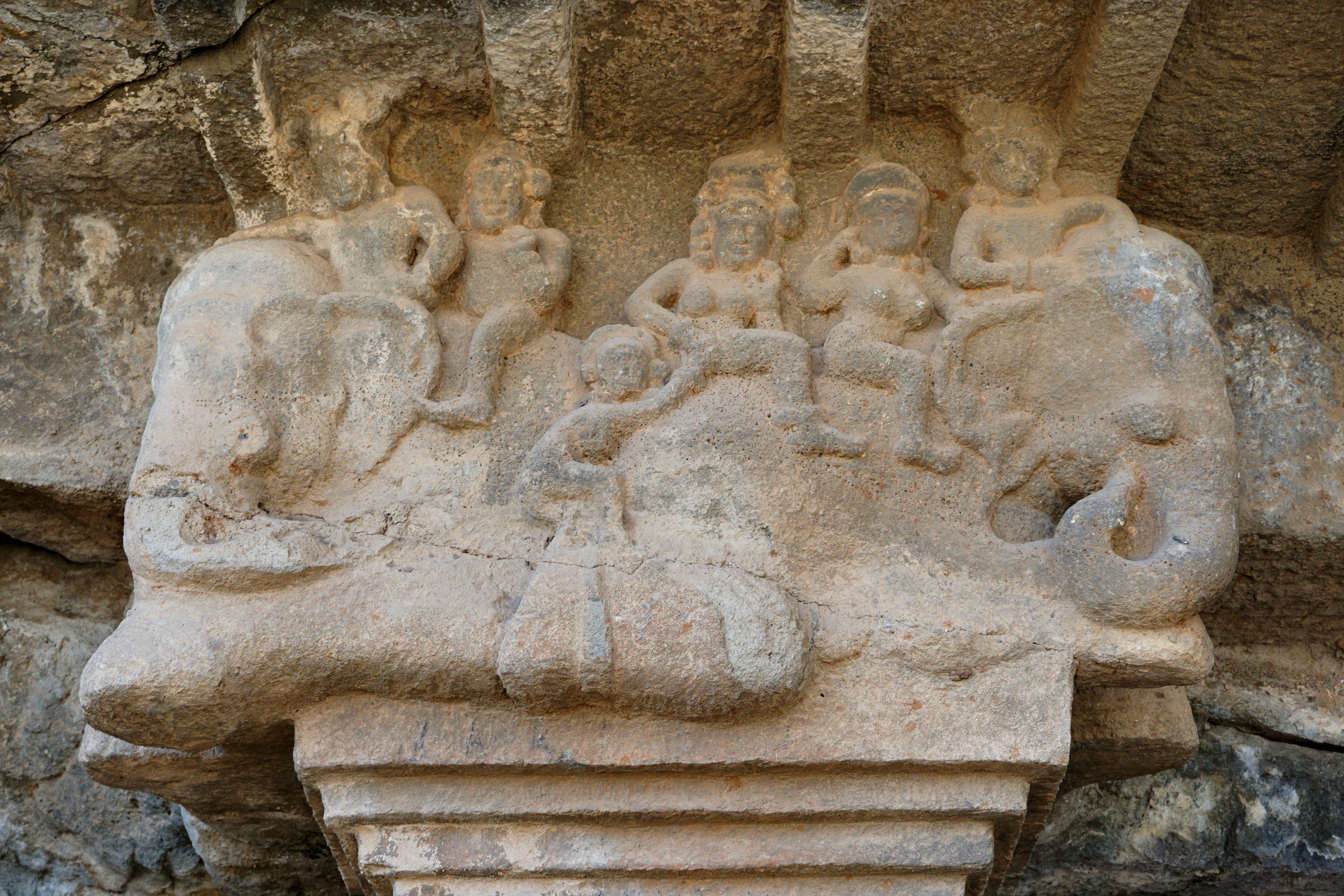
Cave 4, pillar capital

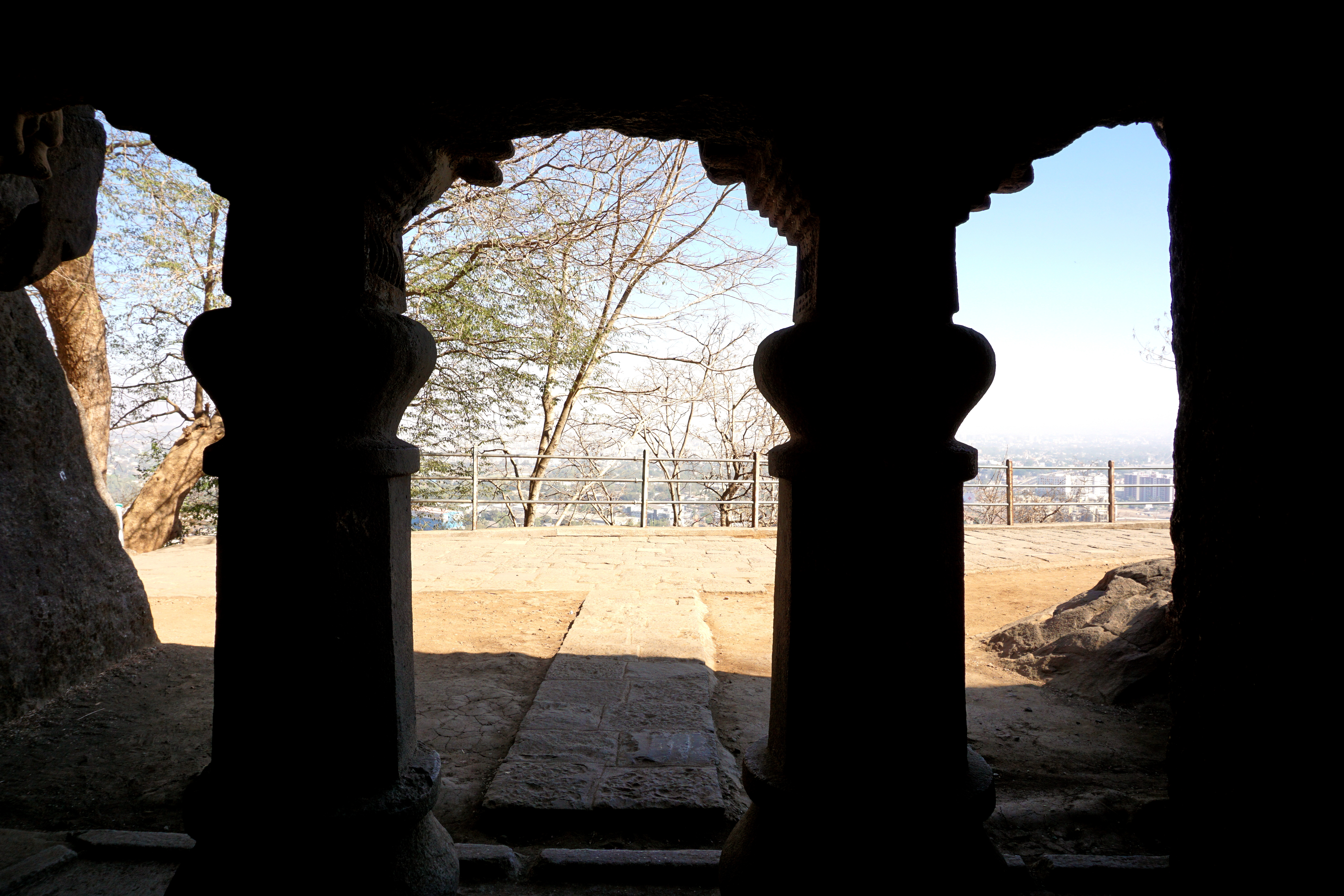
Cave 4, view from the inside.

Cave No.5
There are no inscriptions in this cave.
Caves No.6-7-8
Cave No.6 has an inscription, mentioning its dedication by a merchant to the Samgha. An inscription at Cave No.7 explains it is a gift by a female ascetic named Tapasini to the Samgha. Two inscriptions at Cave No.8 explain the cave is a gift by a fisherman name Mugudasa.
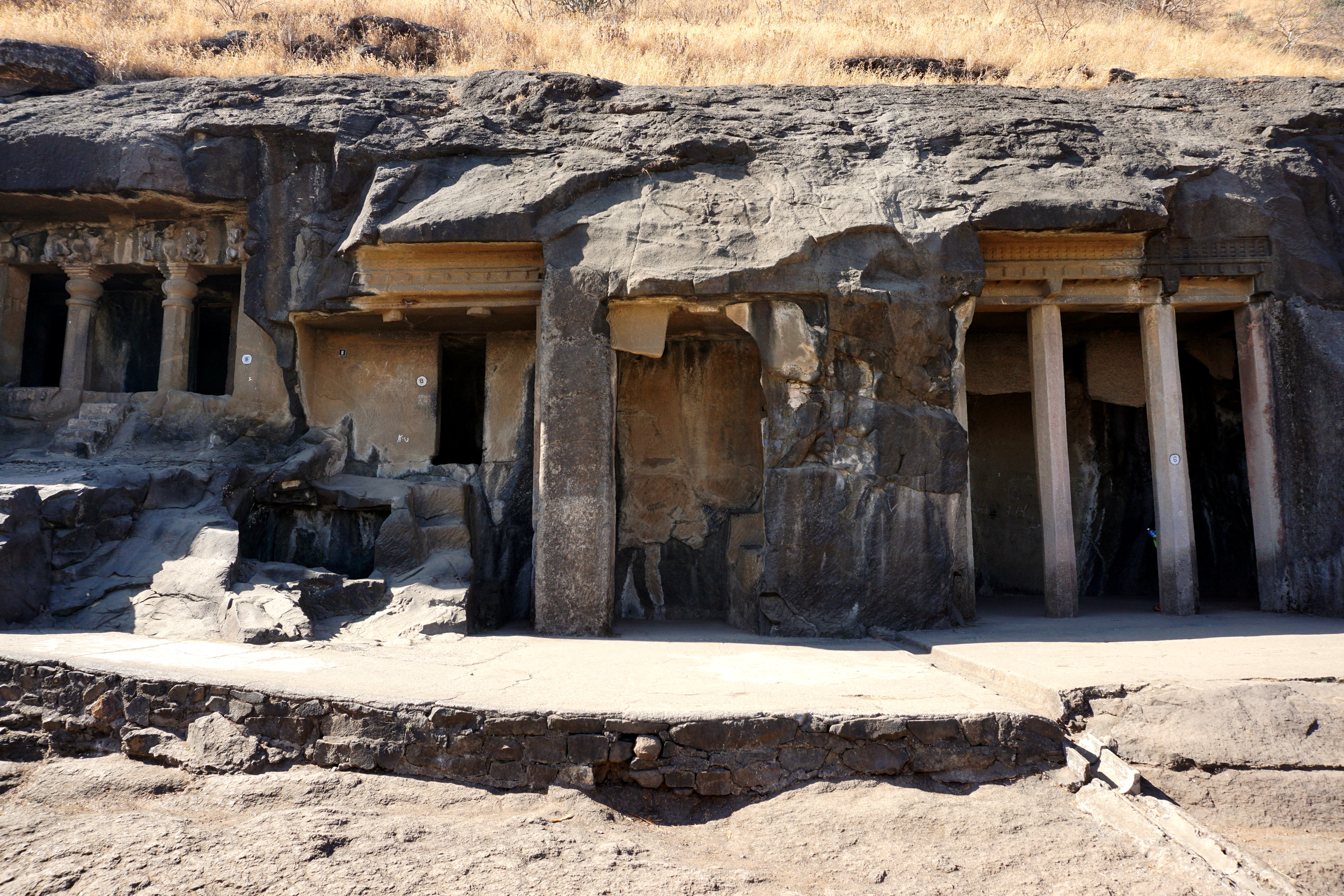
From right to left, cave No.6, cave no.7, cave No.8, cave No.9

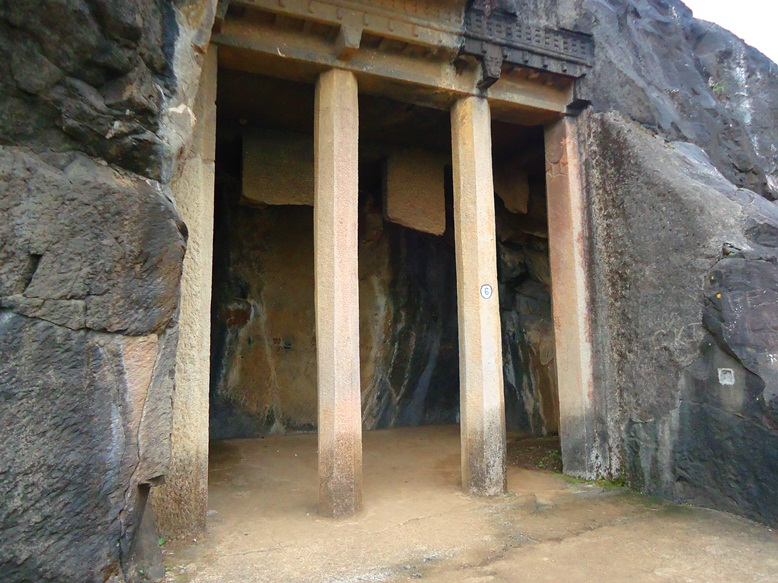
Cave 6, exterior

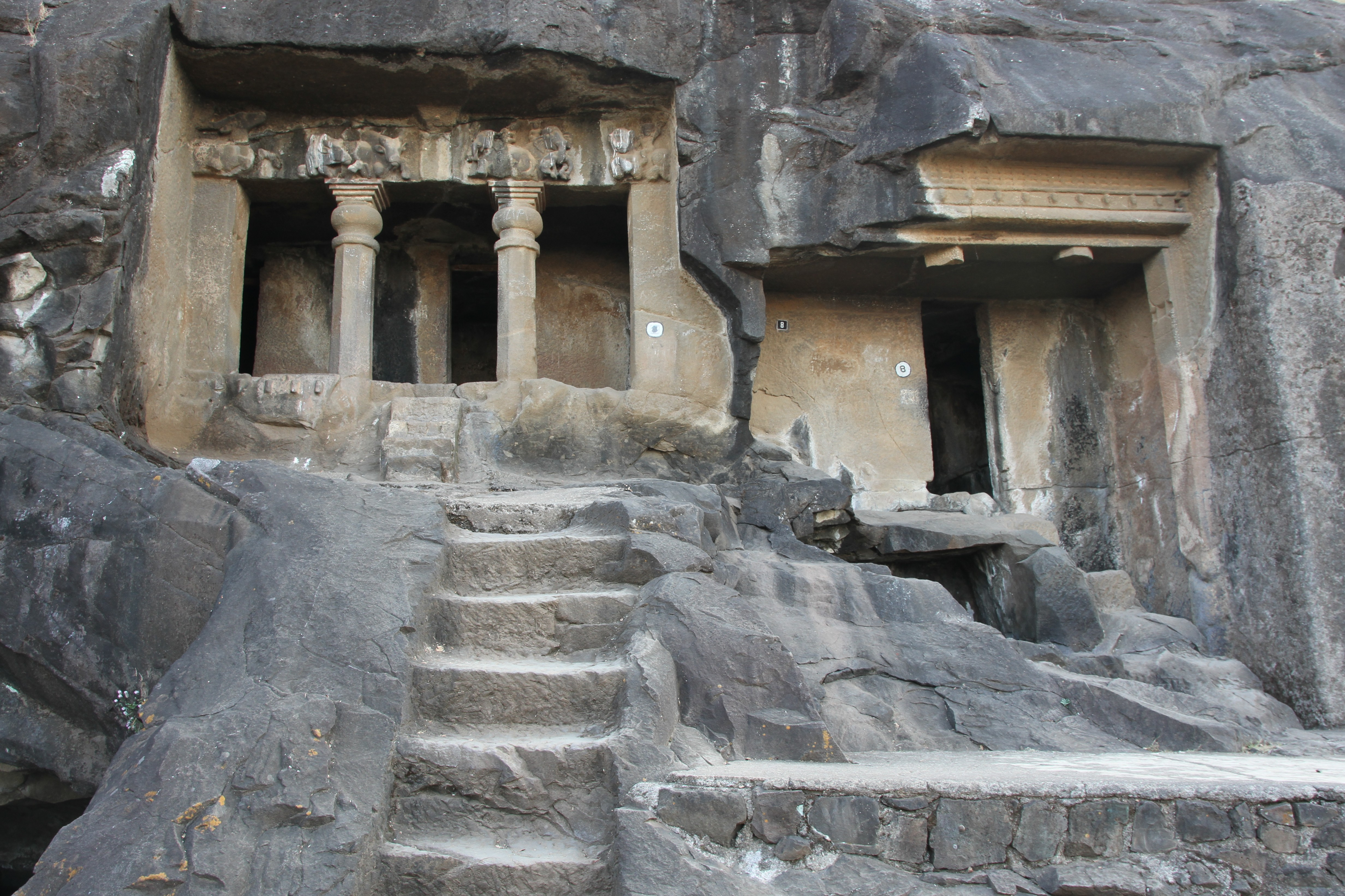
Caves 9 and 8.

Cave No.9
There are no inscriptions in this cave.
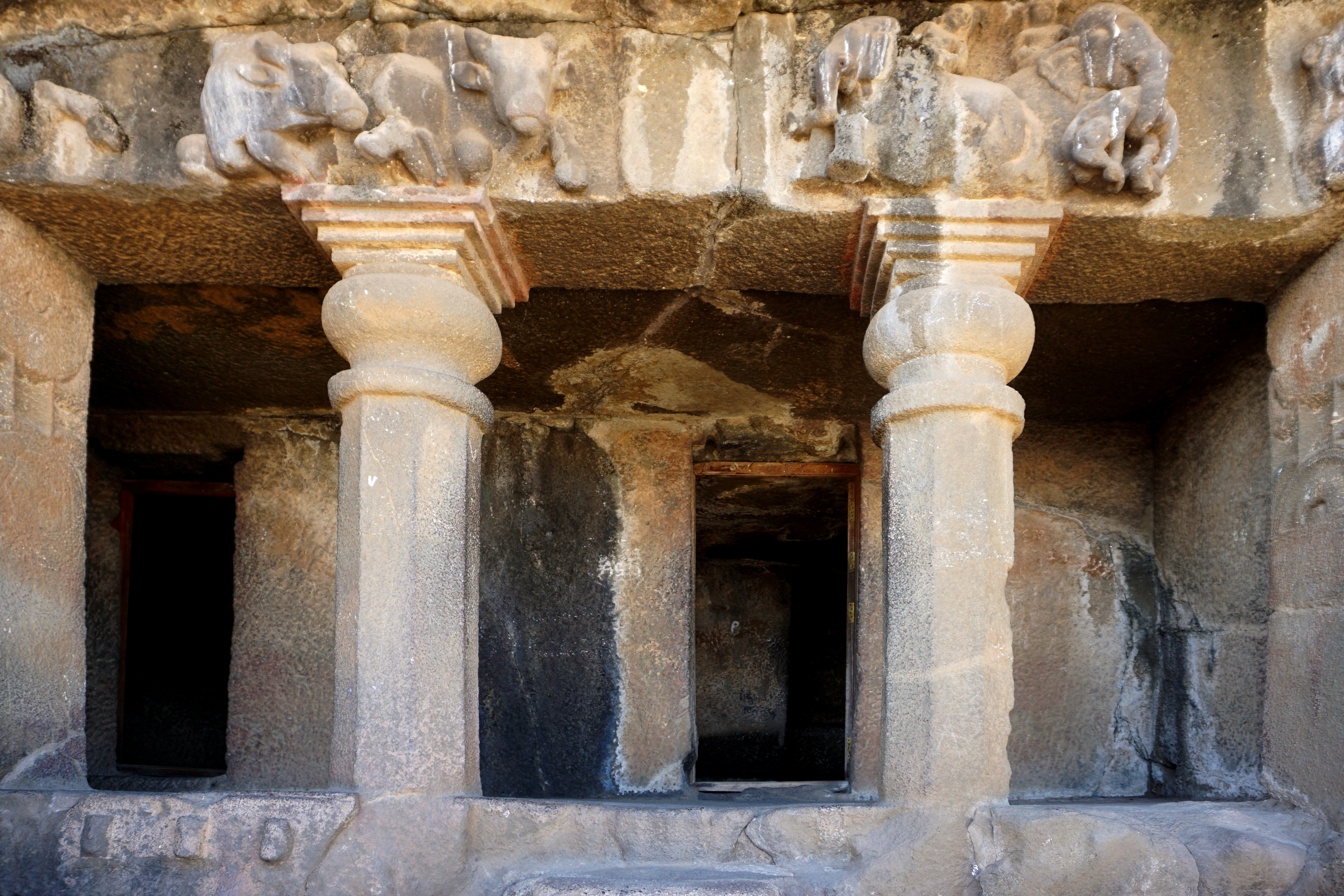
Cave 9, exterior

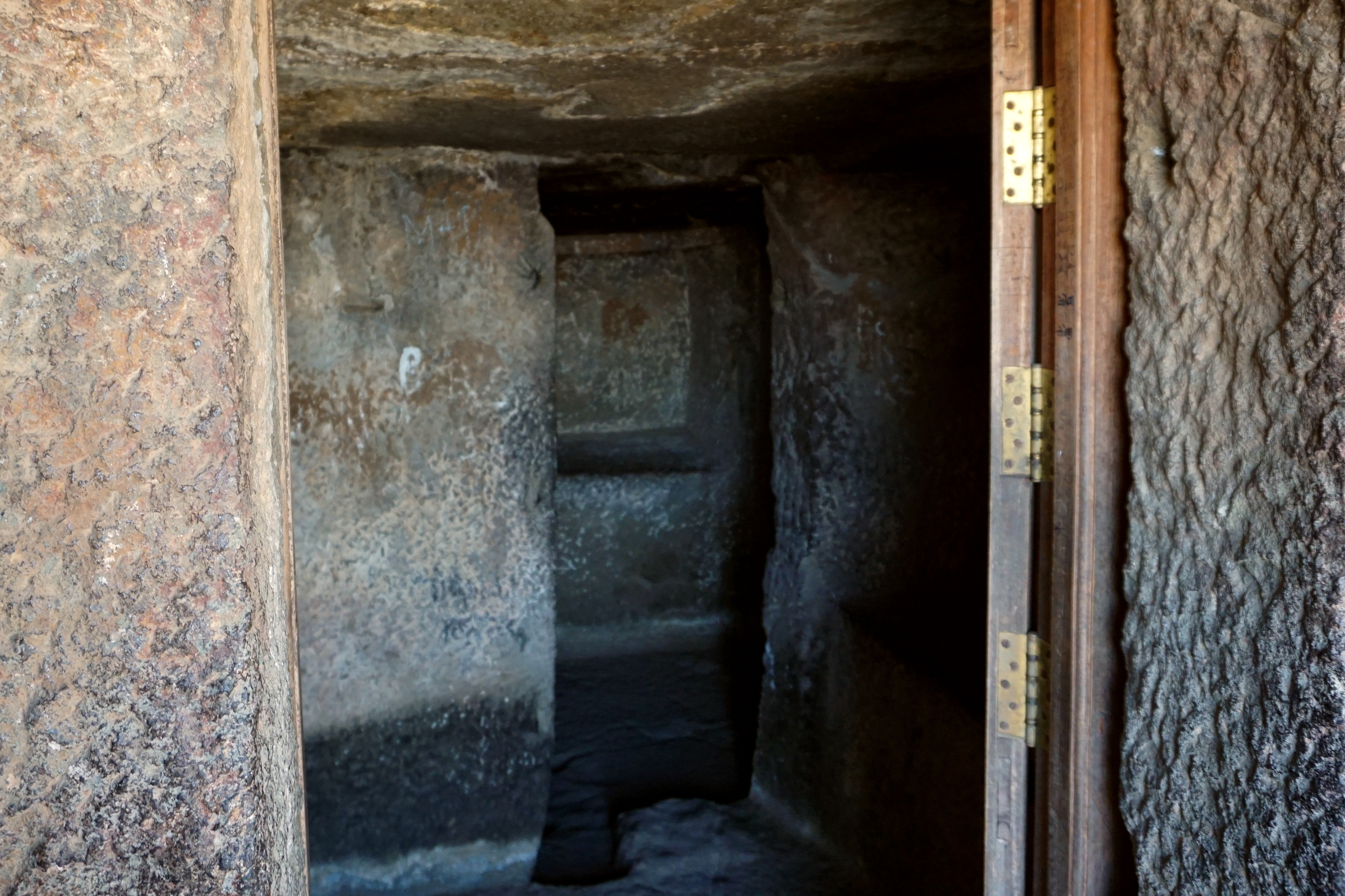
Cave 9, interior

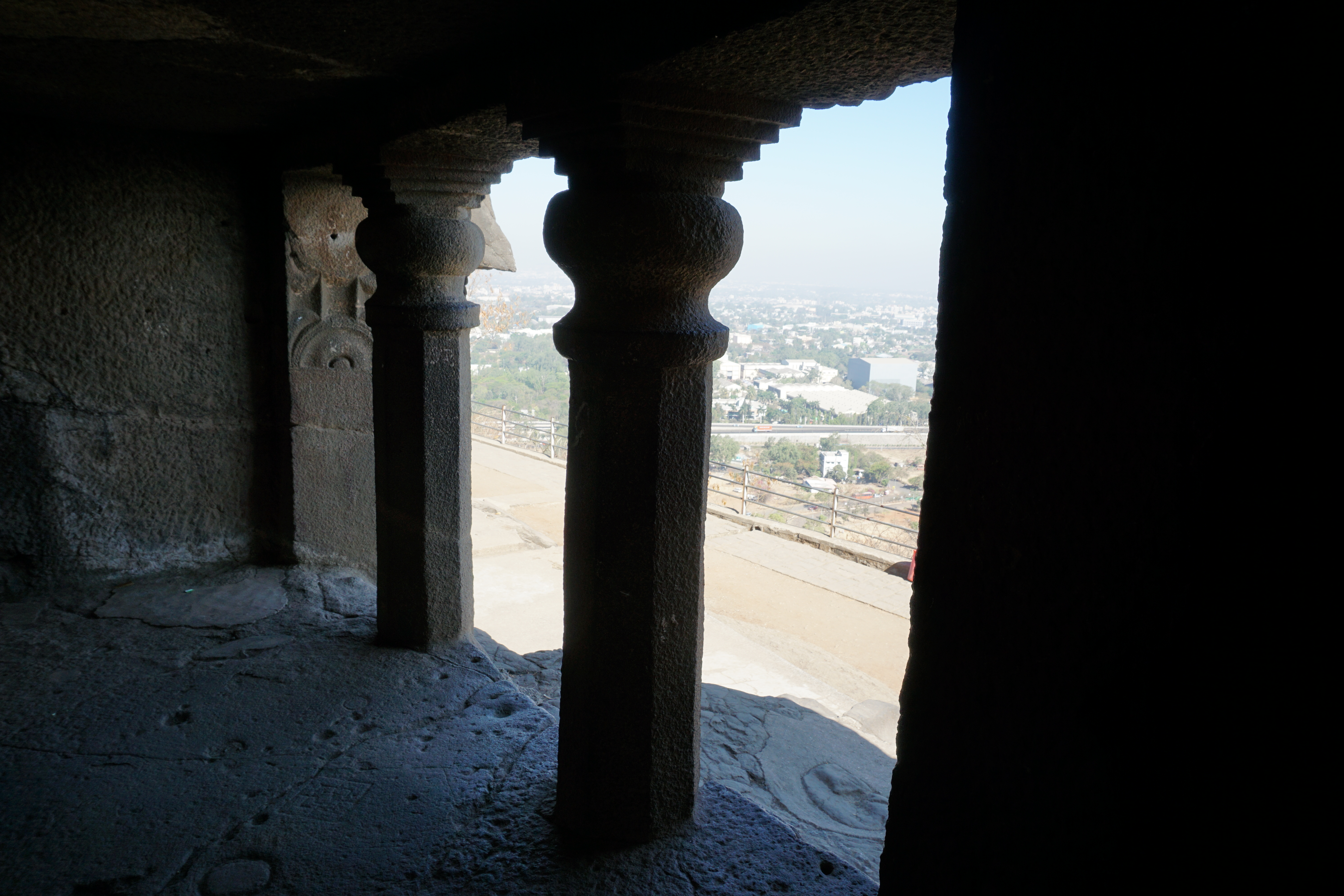
Cave 9, looking outward

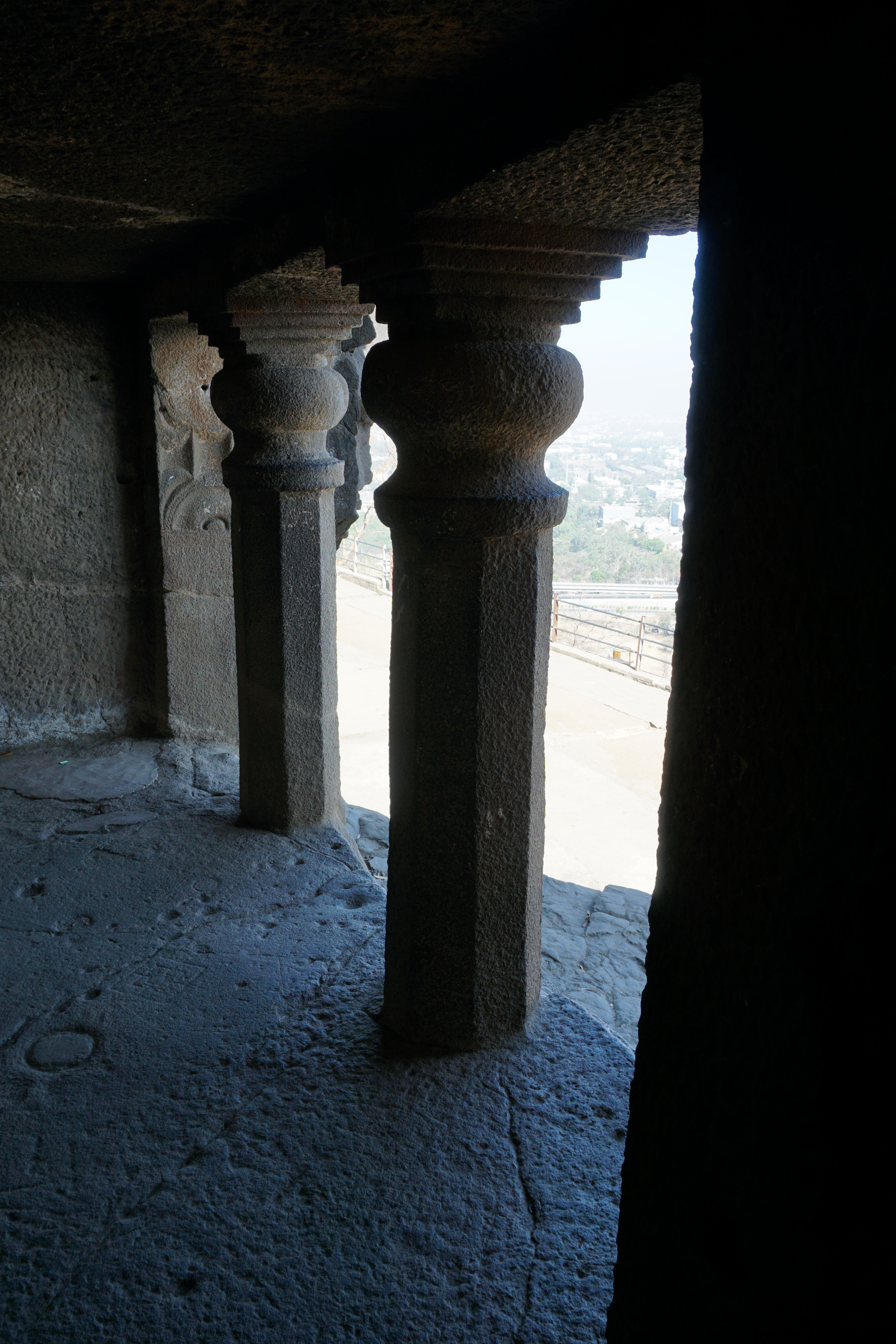
Cave 9, pillars

=== Cave No.10 "Nahapana Vihara" (circa 120 CE) ===
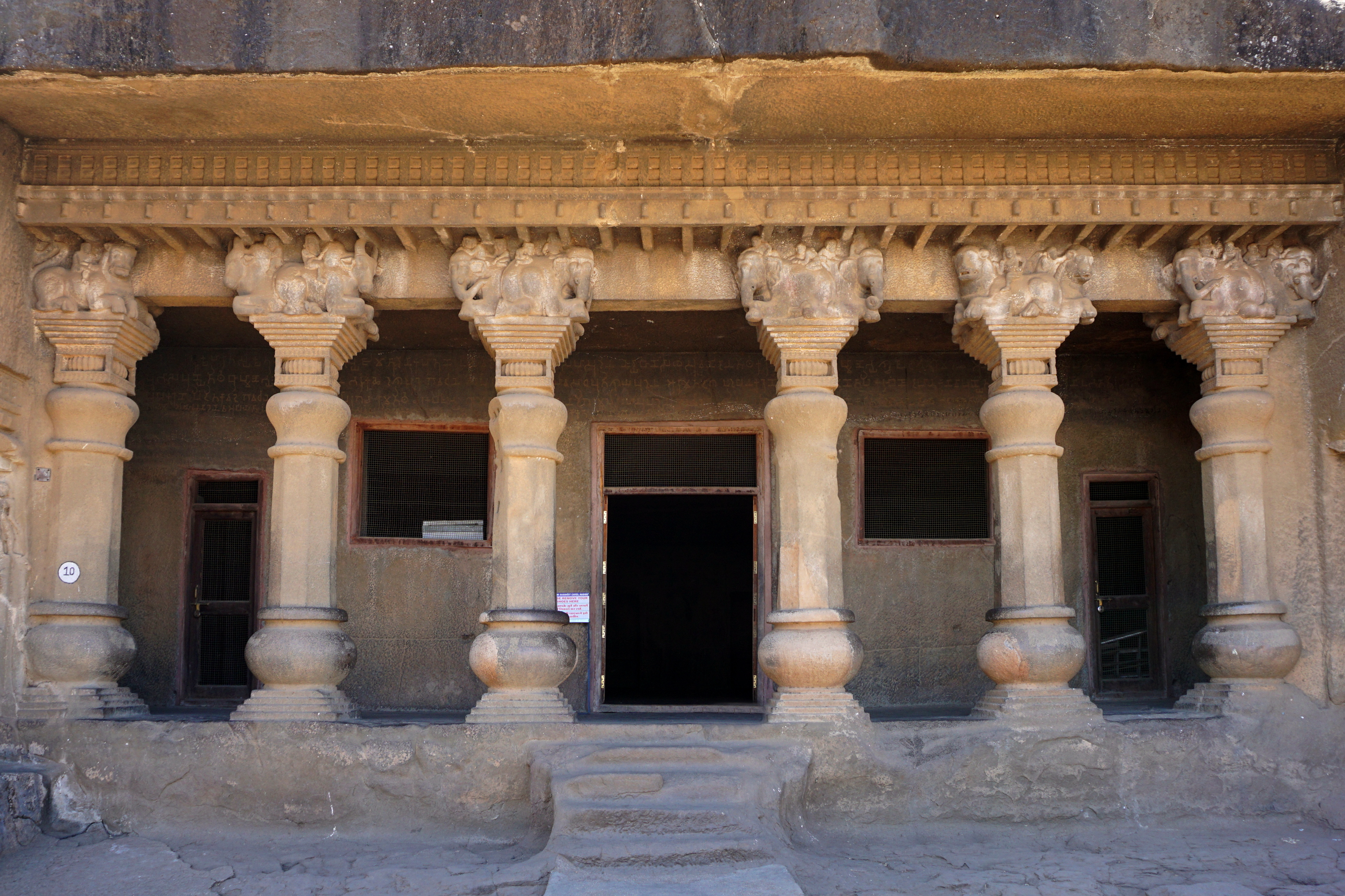
Cave No.10 "Nahapana Vihara" (circa 120 CE). 3D tour.

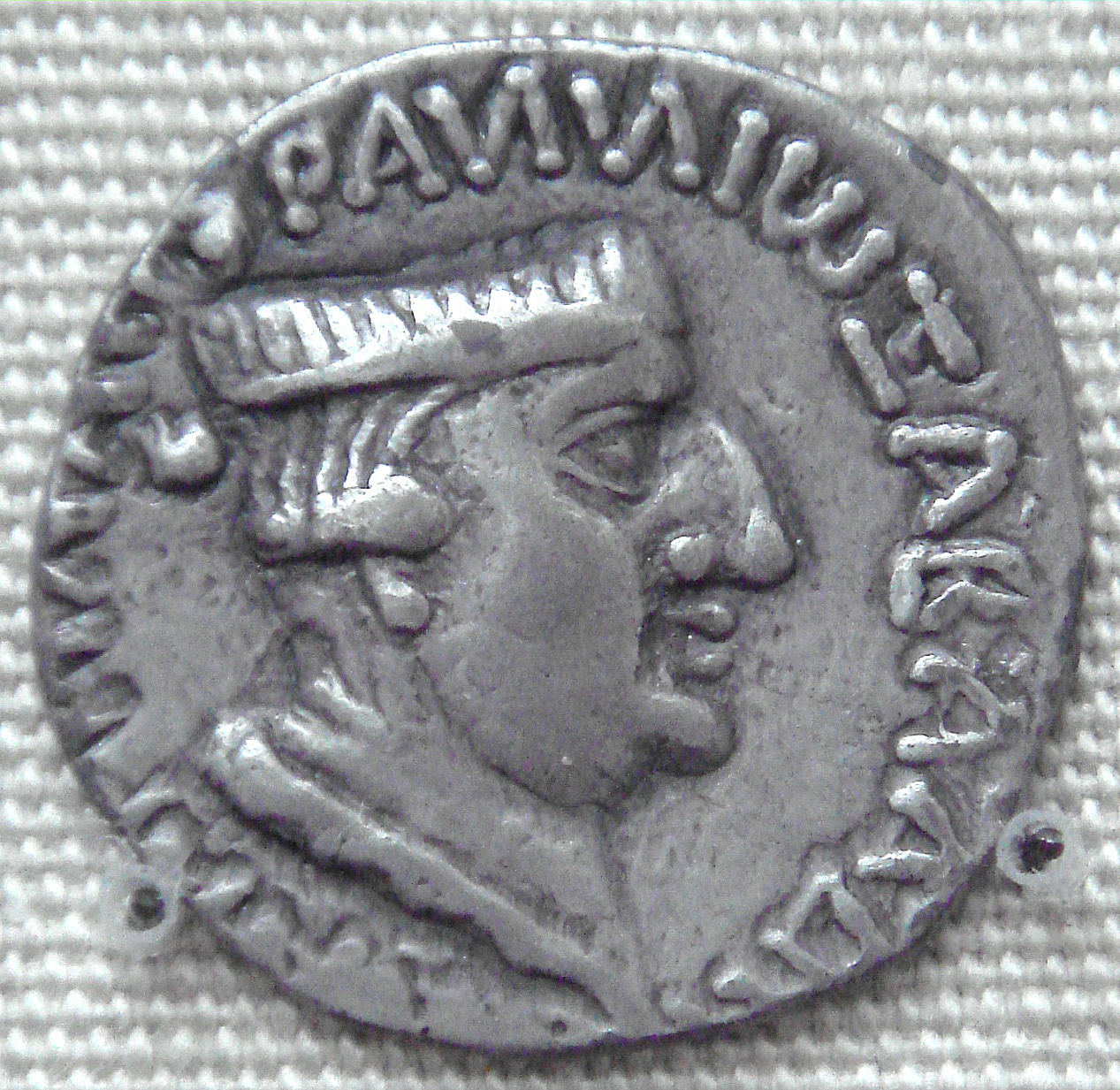
The Indo-Scythian Western Satraps ruler Nahapana built Cave No.10 circa 120 CE.

==== The cave ====
Cave No. 10 is the second largest Vihara, and contains six inscriptions of the family of Nahapana. The six pillars (two of them attached) have more elegant bell-shaped capitals than those in Cave No. 3, and their bases are in the style of those in the Karla Caves Chaitya, and in that next to the Granesa Lena at Junnar; the frieze also, like those that remain on the other small caves between Nos.4 and 9, is carved with the simple rail pattern. At each end of the verandah is a cell, donated by "Dakhamitra, the daughter of King Kshaharata Kshatrapa Nahapana, and wife of Ushavadata, son of Dinika."

Inside hall

The inside hall is about 43 feet wide by 45 feet deep, and is entered by three plain doors, and lighted by two windows. It has five benched cells on each side and six in the back; it wants, however, the bench round the inner sides that can be found in Cave No.3; but, as shown by the capital and ornaments still left, it has had a precisely similar dagoba in low relief on the back wall, which has been long afterwards hewn into a figure of Bhairava. Outside the veranda, too, on the left-hand side, have been two reliefs of this same god, evidently the later insertions of some Hindu devotee.

Comparisons

Since Nahapana was a contemporary of Gautamiputra Satakarni, by whom he was finally vanquished, this cave predates by one generation Cave No. 3, completed in the 18th year of the reign of Gautamiputra's son Sri Pulumavi. Cave No.10 is probably contemporary with Cave No. 17, built by an Indo-Greek "Yavana".

Nahapana is also known for his association with the Great Chaitya in Karla Caves, the largest Chaitya building of Southern Asia. Cave No. 10 and the Karla Caves Chaitya are extremely similar in style, and thought to be essentially contemporary.

Cave No.10 "Nahapana Vihara", circa 120 CE
Several inscriptions from the reign of Western Satraps ruler Nahapana, explaining his viceroy built and donated the cave (see above in the article). This cave, from the reign of Nahapana is thus dated circa 120 CE. It is earlier than the other viharas of the reign of the Satavahana ruler Sri Pulumavi, who is posterior to him by a generation.
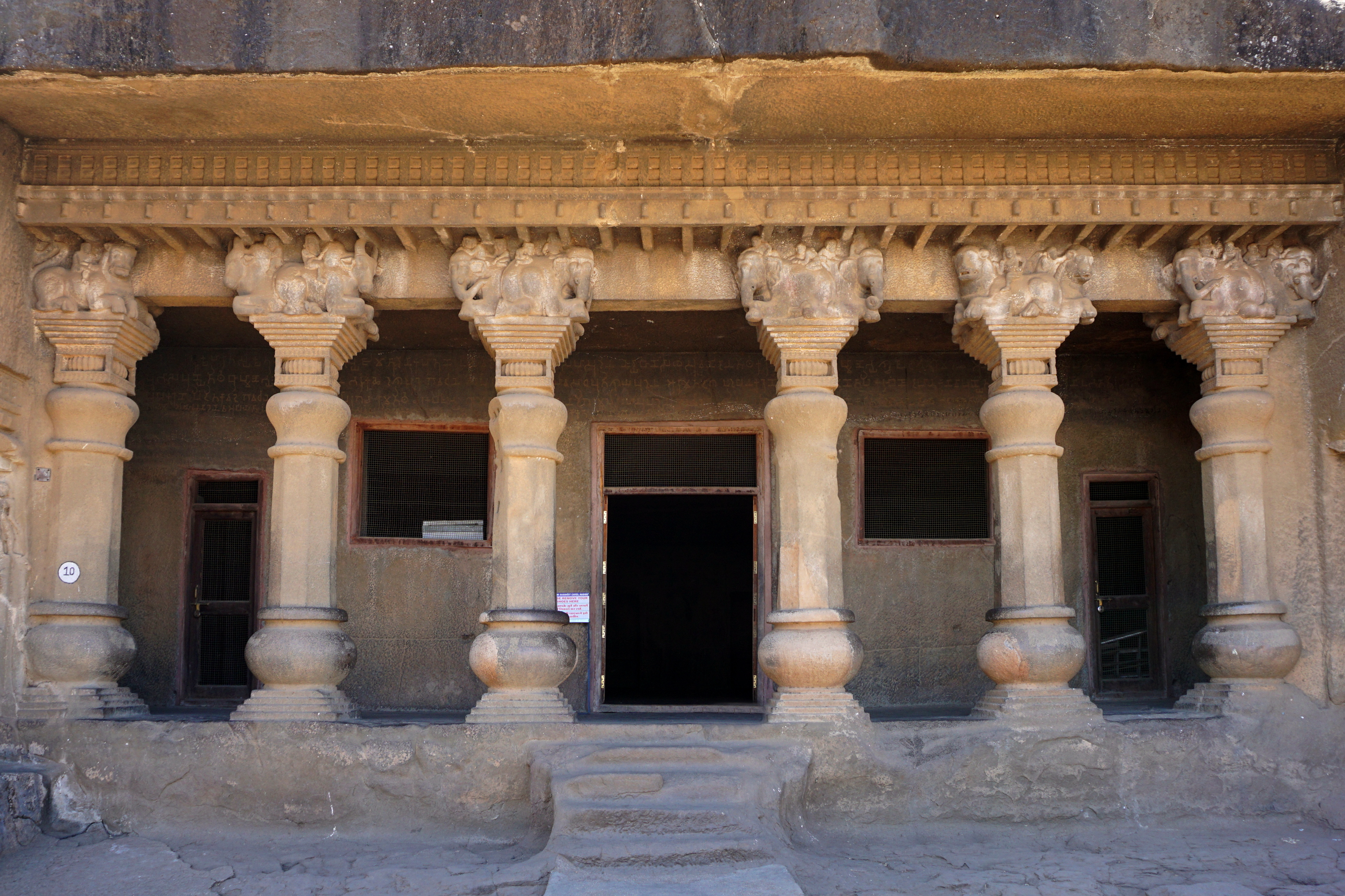
Front

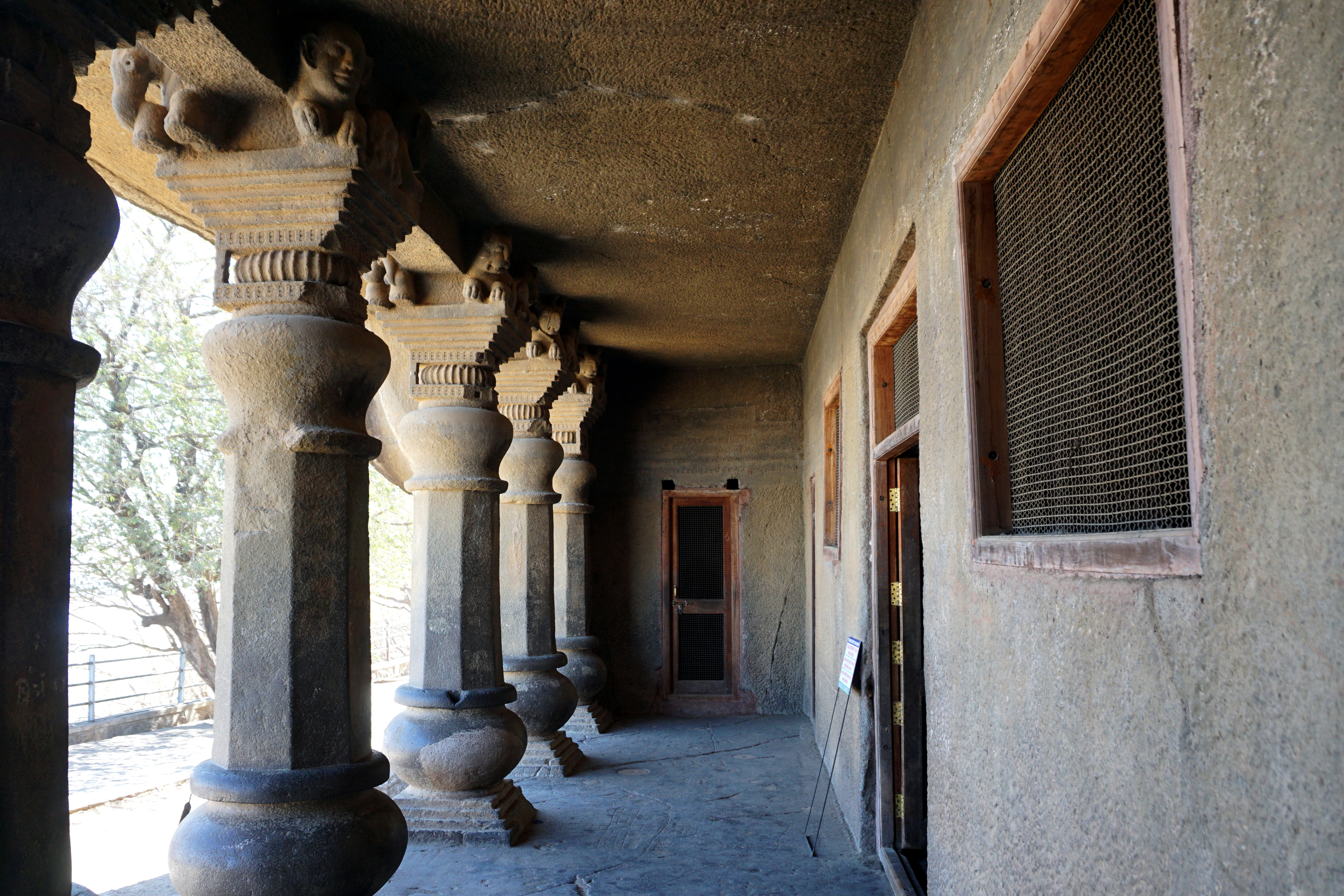
Veranda

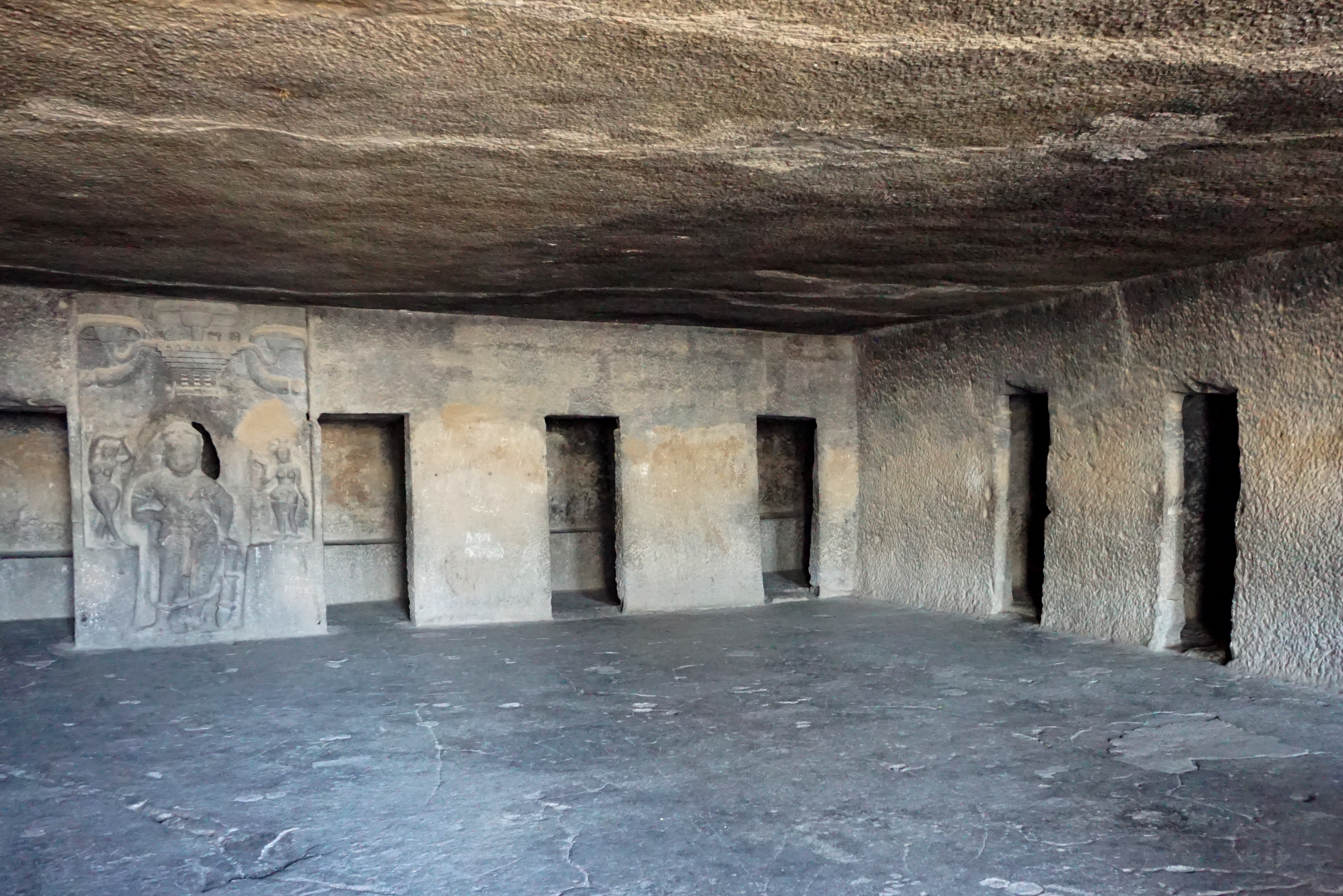
Interior

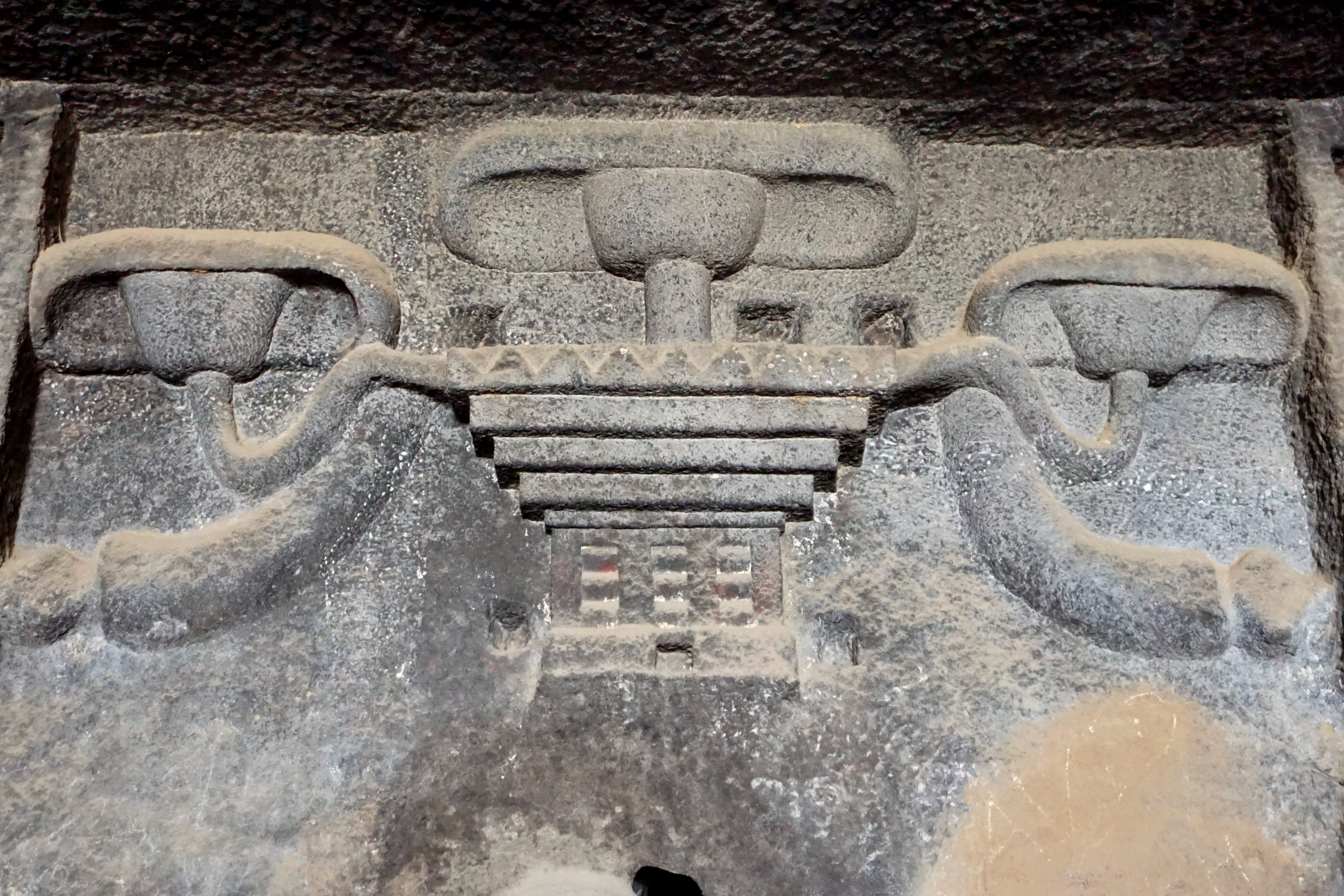
Chaitya and Umbrellas
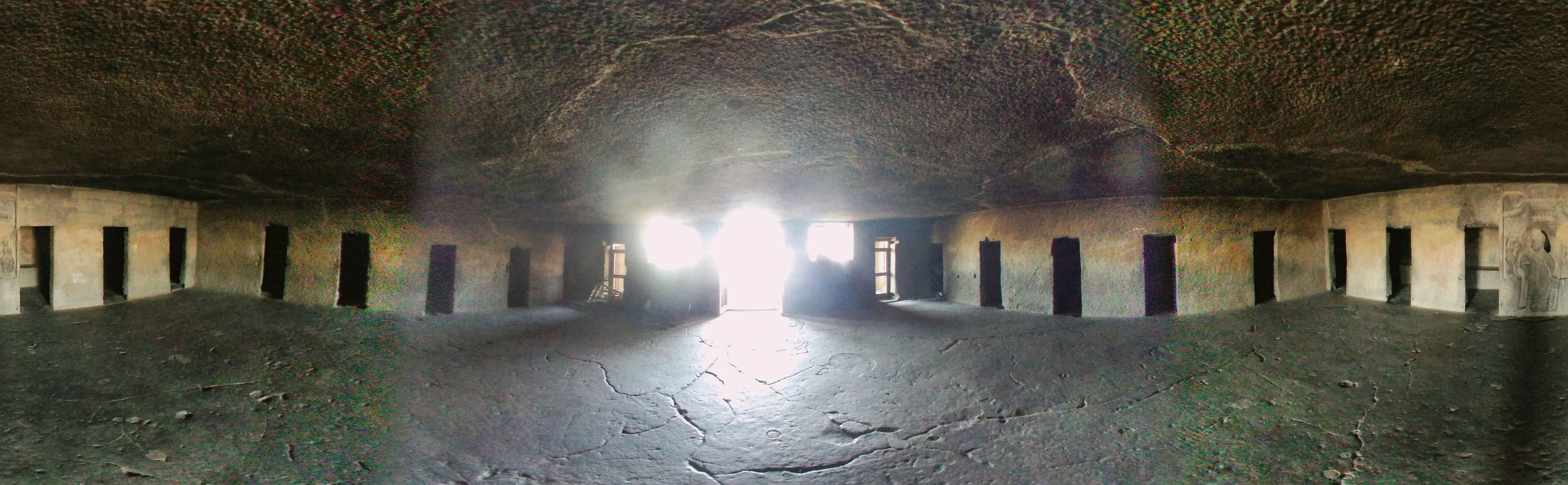

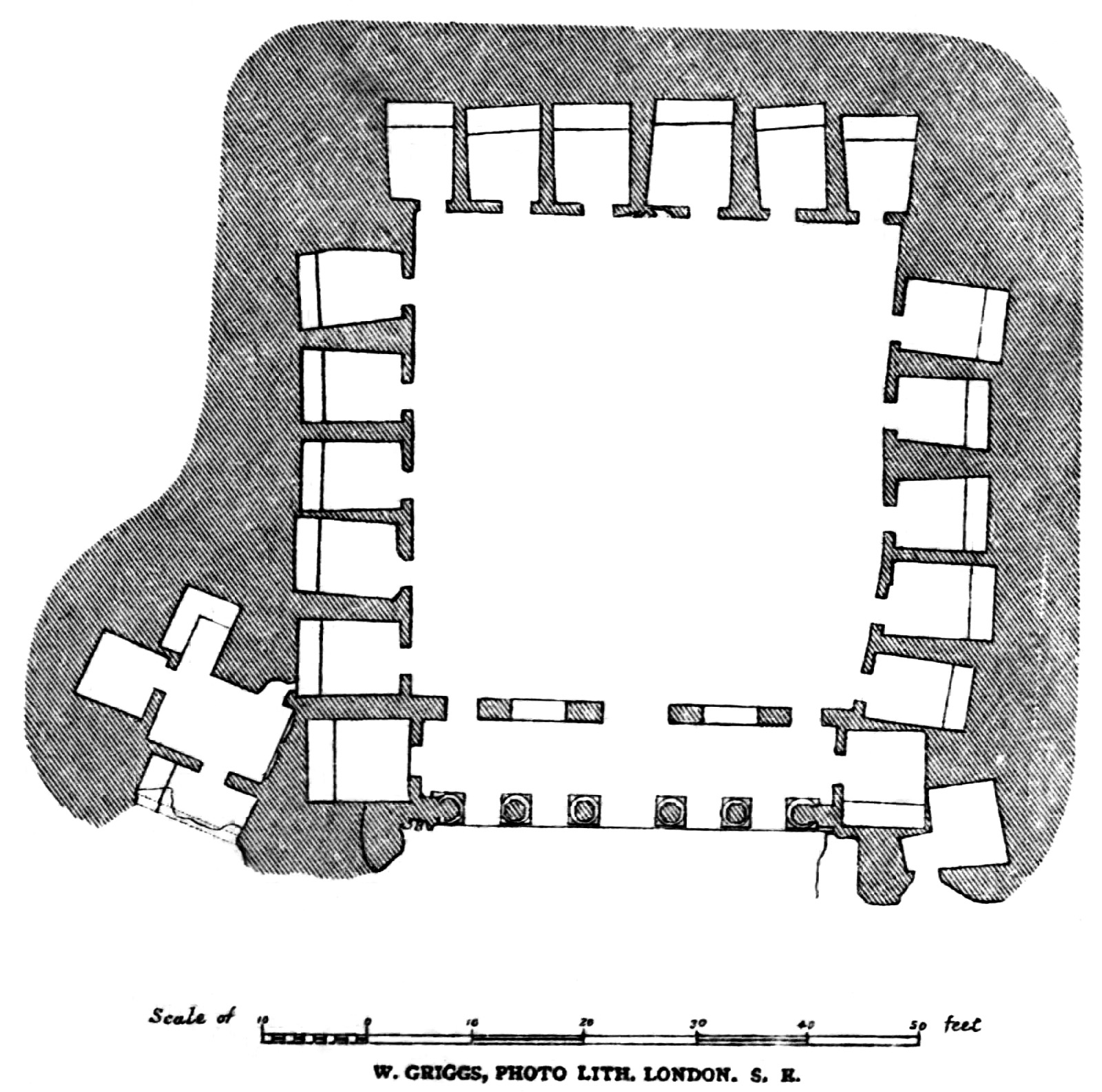
Plan of the vihara

==== Inscriptions ====
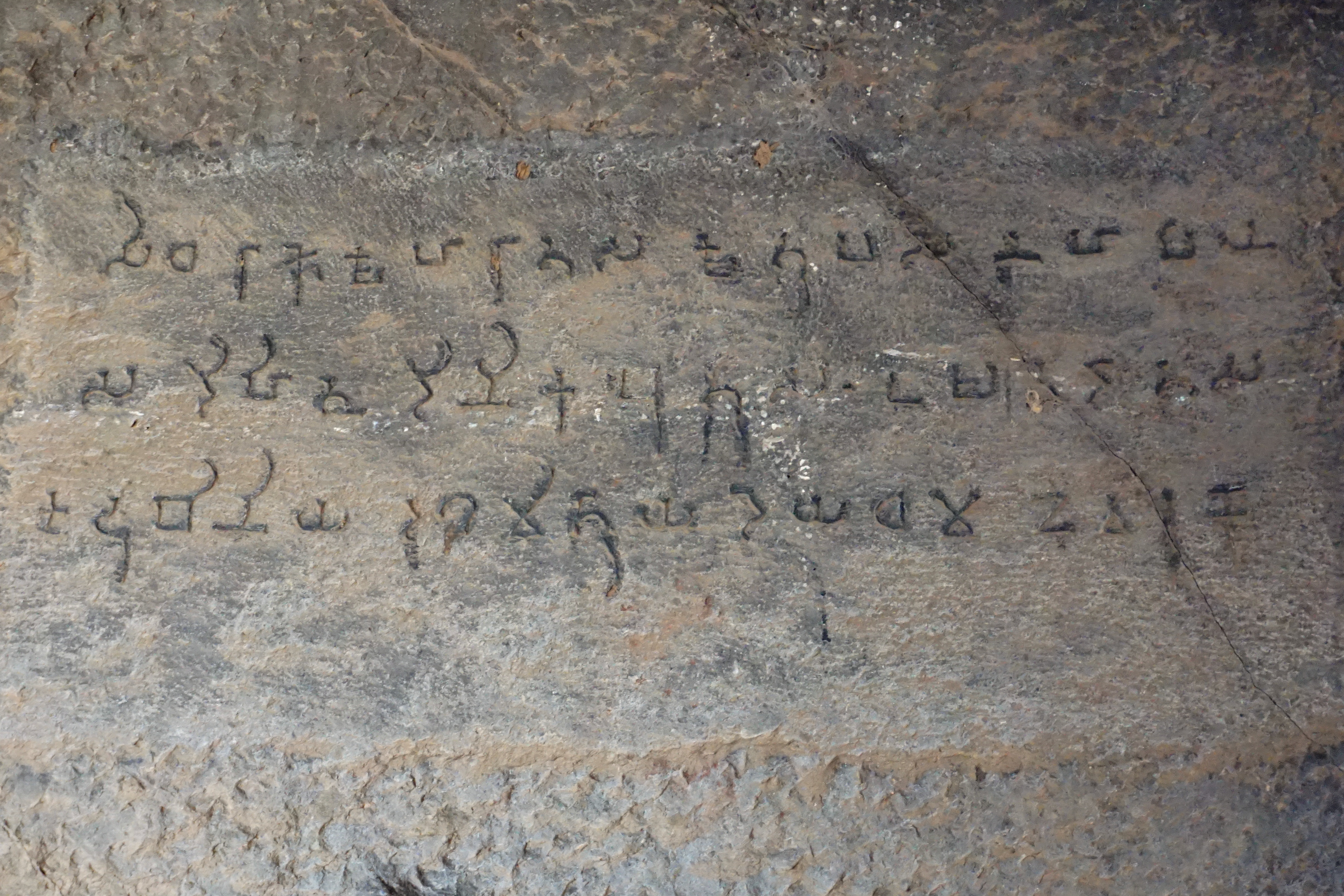
Inscription No.11 by Dakhamitra, wife of Ushavadata, in Cave No.10

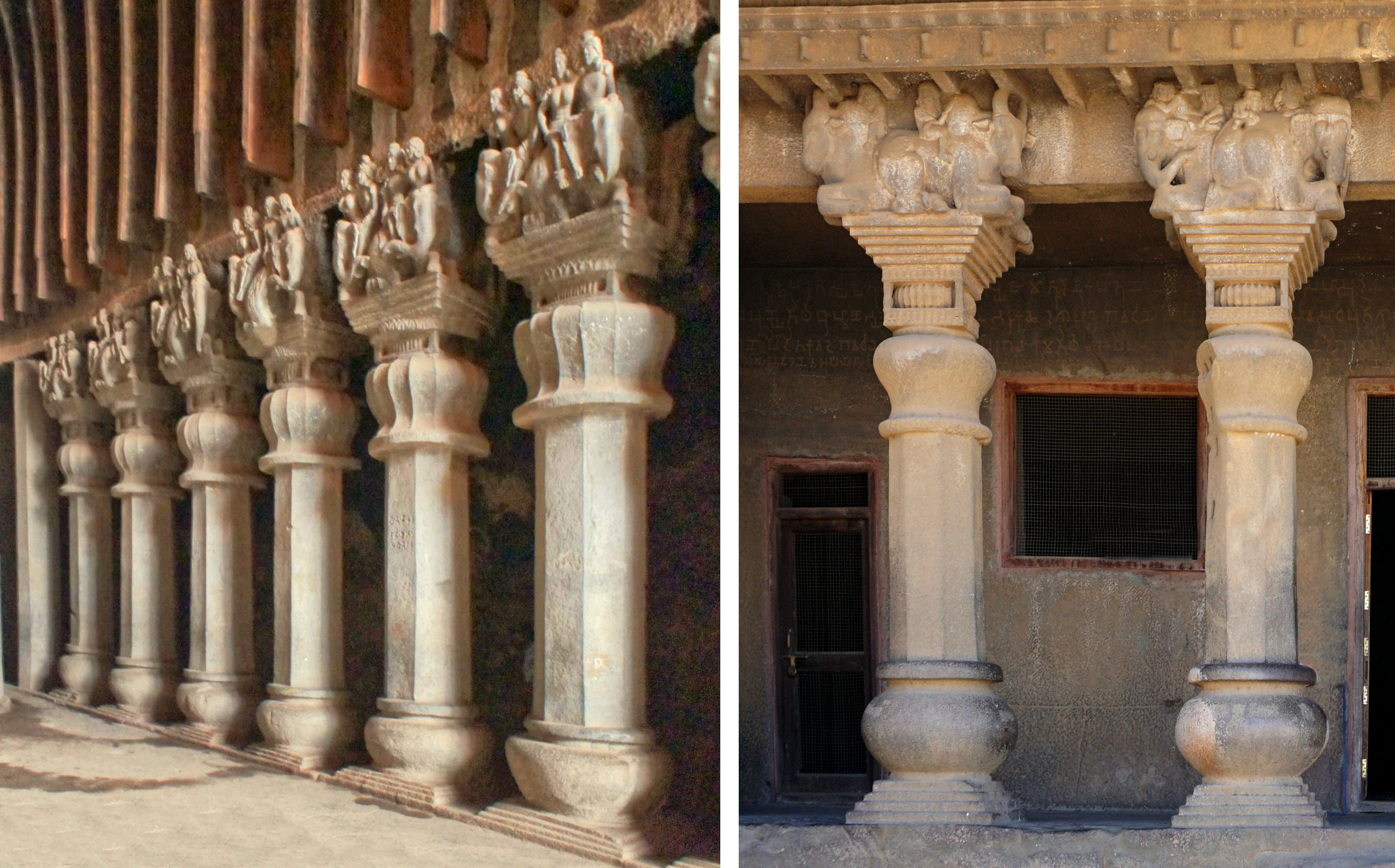
Karla Caves Chaitya pillars (left) compared to Pandavleni Caves Cave No10 pillars (right), all built by Ushavadata, son-in-law of Nahapana, circa 120 CE.

The Nasik inscription of Ushavadata is an inscription made in cave no.10 by Ushavadata, a son-in-law of the Western Satraps ruler Nahapana, in the years circa 120 CE. The main inscription on the doorfront (inscription No.10) is the earliest known instance of the usage of Sanskrit, although a rather hybrid form, in western India. It also documents the Indian tradition of dana (charity) to Buddhist monks and of building infrastructure to serve pilgrims and the general public by the 2nd-century CE.

The inscriptions reveal that in 105-106 CE, Western Satraps defeated the Satavahanas after which Kshatrapa Nahapana's son-in-law and Dinika's son- Ushavadata donated 3000 gold coins for this cave as well as for the food and clothing of the monks. Usabhdatta's wife (Nahapana's daughter), Dakshmitra also donated one cave for the Buddhist monks. Cave 10 - 'Nahapana Vihara' is spacious with 16 rooms.

Over the doorway of the left cell appears the following inscription:

"Success ! This cell, the gift of Dakhamitra, wife of Ushavadata, son of Dinika, and daughter of king Nahapana, the Khshaharata Kshatrapa."

— Inscription No.11, Cave 10, Nasik

Two inscriptions in Cave 10 mentions the building and the gift of the whole cave to the Samgha by Ushavadata, the son-in-law and viceroy of Nahapana:

"Success ! Ushavadata, son of Dinika, son-in-law of king Nahapana, the Kshaharata Kshatrapa, (...) inspired by (true) religion, in the Trirasmi hills at Govardhana, has caused this cave to be made and these cisterns."

— Part of inscription No.10 of Ushavadata, Cave No.10, Nasik

"Success ! In the year 42, in the month Vesakha, Ushavadata, son of Dinika, son-in- law of king Nahapana, the Kshaharata Kshatrapa, has bestowed this cave on the Samgha generally...."

— Part of inscription No.12 of Ushavadata, Cave No.10, Nasik

Inscription of Ushavadata, son-in-law of Nahapana
Nasik Cave No.10, inscription No.10
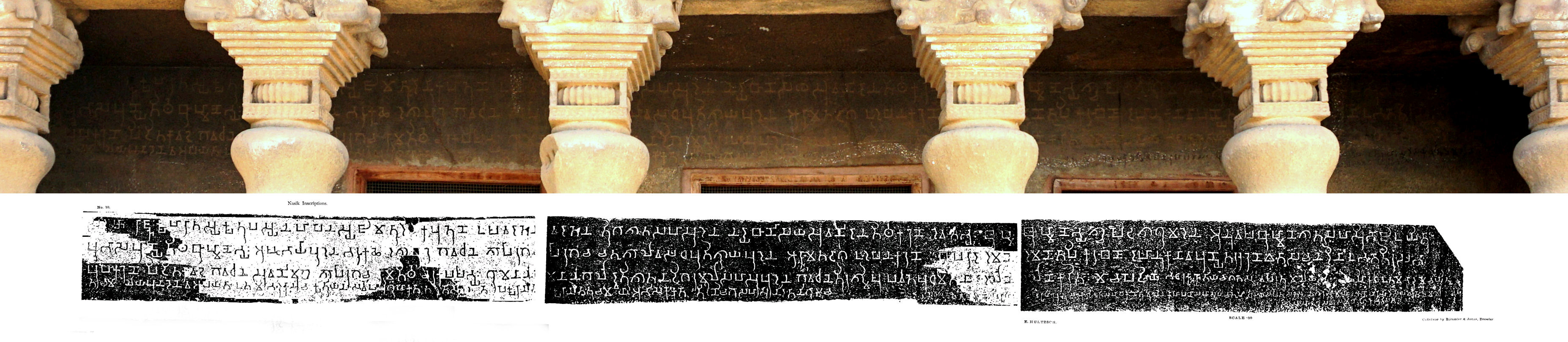
Inscription No.10. of Ushavadata runs the length of the entrance wall, over the doors, and is here visible in parts between the pillars. The imprint was cut in 3 portions for convenience. Cave No.10, Nasik Caves.

Full text of inscription No.10 (hybrid Sanskrit, Brahmi script):

"Success! Ushavadata, Dinika's son, son-in-law of king Nahapana, the Kshaharata Kshatrapa,

- who has given three-hundred-thousand cows, who has made .gifts of money and tirthas on the river Barnasa, who has given sixteen villages to the gods and Brahmanas, who causes one-hundred-thousand Brahmanas to be fed the (whole) year round, who has given eight wives to Brahmanas at the religious tirtha of Prabhasa, who at Bharukachha, Dedapura, Govardhana and Sorparaga has given the shelter of quadrangular rest-houses, who has made wells, tanks, and gardens, who has out of charity established free ferries by boats on the Iba, Parada, Damana, Tapi, Karabena and Dahanuka, and erected on both banks of these rivers shelters for meeting and such for gratuitous distribution of water, who has given thirty-two-thousand stems of coconut trees at the village Nanamgola to the congregation of Charakas at Pimditakvada, Govardhana, Suvarnamukha and the Ramatirtha in Sorparaga,
- inspired by (true) religion, in the Trirasmi hills at Govardhana, has caused this cave to be made and these cisterns.
- And by order of the lord I went to release the chief of the Uttamabhadras, who had been besieged for the rainy season by the Malayas, and those Malayas fled at the mere roar (of my approaching) as it were, and were all made prisoners of the Uttamabhadra warriors.
- Thence I went to the Pokshara tanks, and there I bathed and gave three-thousand cows and a village. A field has also been given by him, bought at the hands of the Brahmana Asvibhuti, son of Varahi, for the price of four-thousand - 4,000 - karshapanas, which (field) belonged to his father, on the boundary of the town towards the north-western side. From it food will be procured for all monks, without distinction, dwelling in my cave."

— Inscription of Ushavadata, Nasik Cave No.10, inscription No.10.

Altogether, the caves contain six inscriptions of the family of Nahapana, but the Ushavadata inscription is particularly important in that it is the earliest known instance of the usage of Sanskrit, although a rather hybrid form, in western India. Most of the other inscriptions made by the Western Satraps were in Prakrit, using the Brahmi script.

In what has been described as "the great linguistical paradox of India", Sanskrit inscriptions first appeared much later than Prakrit inscriptions, although Prakrit is considered a descendant of the Sanskrit language. This is because Prakrit, in its multiple variants, had been favoured since the time of the influential Edicts of Ashoka (circa 250 BCE). Besides a few examples from the 1st century BCE, most of the early Sanskrit inscriptions date to the time of the Indo-Scythian rulers, either the Northern Satraps around Mathura for the earliest ones, or, slightly later, the closely related Western Satraps in western and central India. It is thought that these Indo-Scythian rulers became promoters of Sanskrit as a way to show their attachment to Indian culture: according to Salomon "their motivation in promoting Sanskrit was presumably a desire to establish themselves as legitimate Indian or at least Indianized rulers and to curry the favor of the educated Brahmanical elite".

The inscription was followed by the Junagadh rock inscription, inscribed by Rudradaman I circa 150 CE, is "the first long inscription recorded entirely in more or less standard Sanskrit". Sanskrit inscriptions by the Western Satraps are not found for about two hundred years after the Rudradaman reign, but it is important because its style is the prototype of the eulogy-style Sanskrit inscriptions found in the Gupta Empire era. These inscriptions are all in the Brahmi script.

The first three lines of the inscription consist of a eulogy of Ushavadata, and are written in fairly standard Sanskrit, except for a few hybrid features, including several sandhi hiatuses and hybrid morphology (e.g. bhojāpayitrā). The rest of the inscription records the actual donations, and is more hybrid. Ushavadatta is otherwise known for making inscriptions in Prakrit in the Karla Caves, which, especially for the eulogy portion, are largely similar in content.

According to Richard Salomon, Ushavadatta may have followed the example set by the Northern Satraps of Mathura, in using Sanskrit in some of his inscriptions. It would seem the usage of literary Sanskrit may have been a fashionable way of adding some formality to inscriptions which had traditionally been made in Prakrit.

=== Caves No.11, "Jain cave" ===
Cave No.11 is close to Cave No.10, but at a somewhat higher level. In the left end of the veranda is the fragment of a seat; the room inside is 11 feet 7 inches by 7 feet 10 inches, having a cell, 6 feet 8 inches square, at the left end, and another, not quite so large, at the back, with a bench at the side and back. In the front room is carved, on the back wall, in low relief, a sitting figure and attendants on a lion throne, and on the right-end wall a fat figure of Amba on a tiger with attendants, and an Indra on an elephant: all are small, clumsily carved, and evidently of late Jaina workmanship.

Cave No.11 has one inscription mentioning it is the gift of the son of a writer: " the benefaction of Ramanaka, the son of Sivamitra, the writer."

Cave No.11
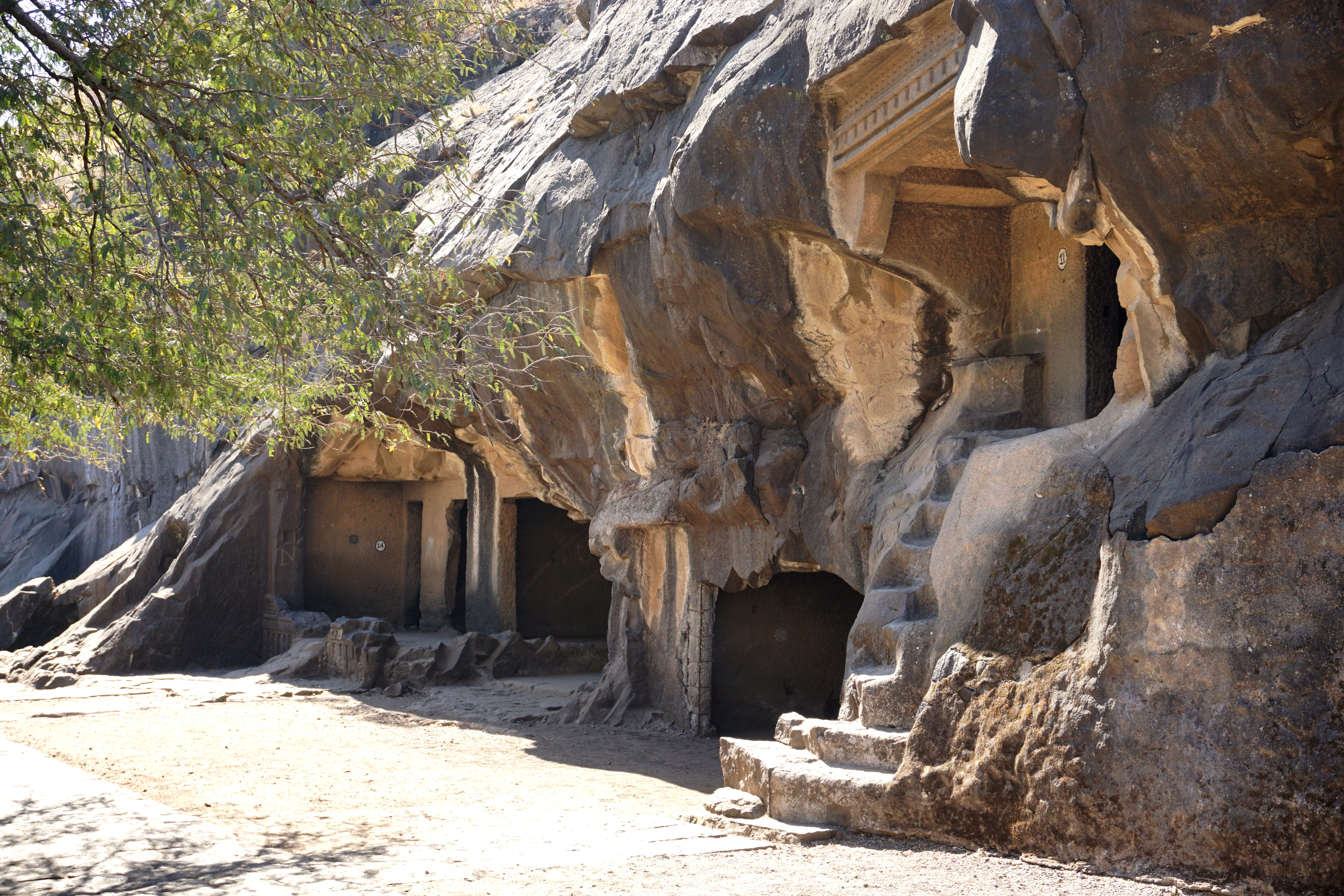
Caves 11 (forefront with stairs) to 14, exterior

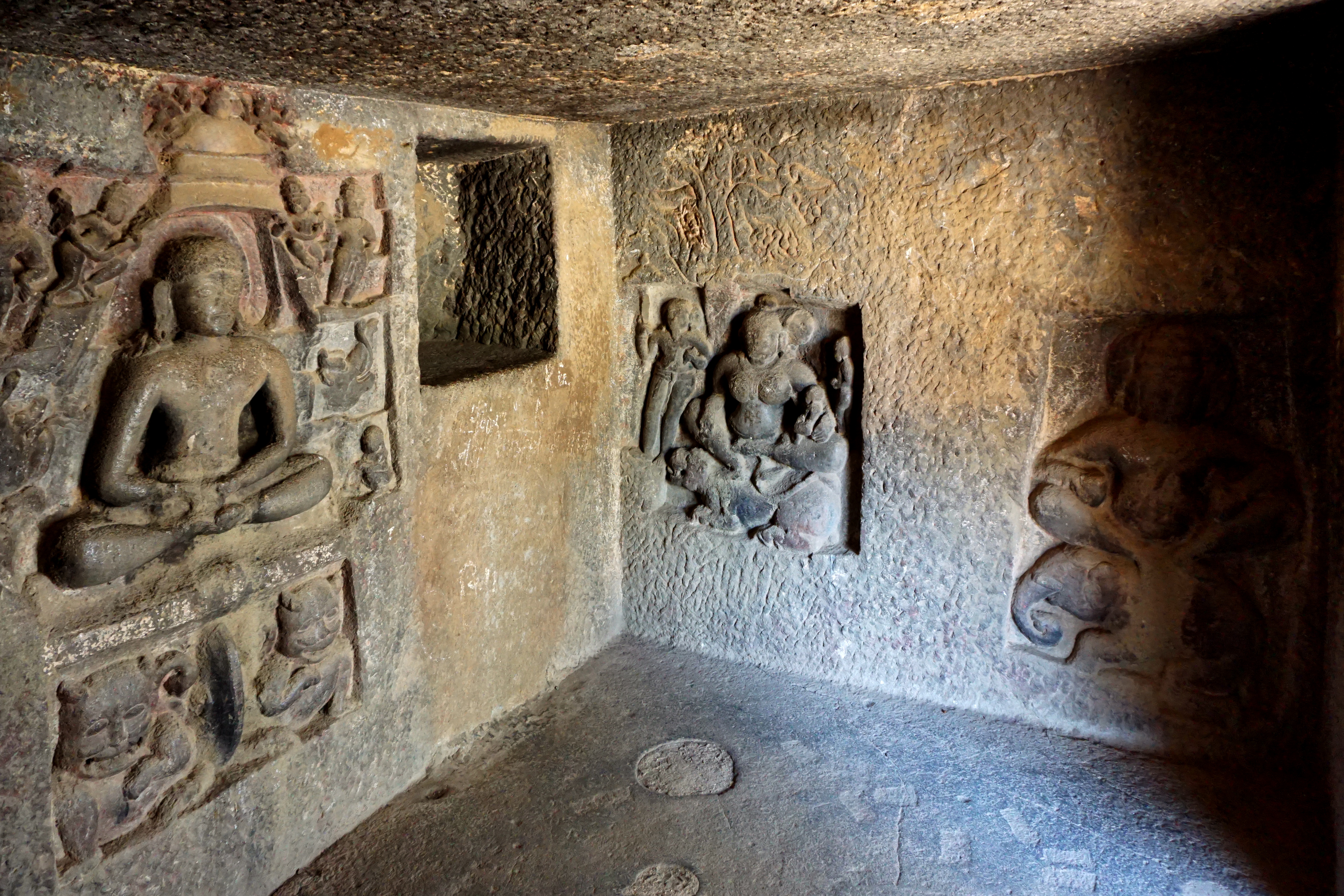
Cave 11, Jain reliefs

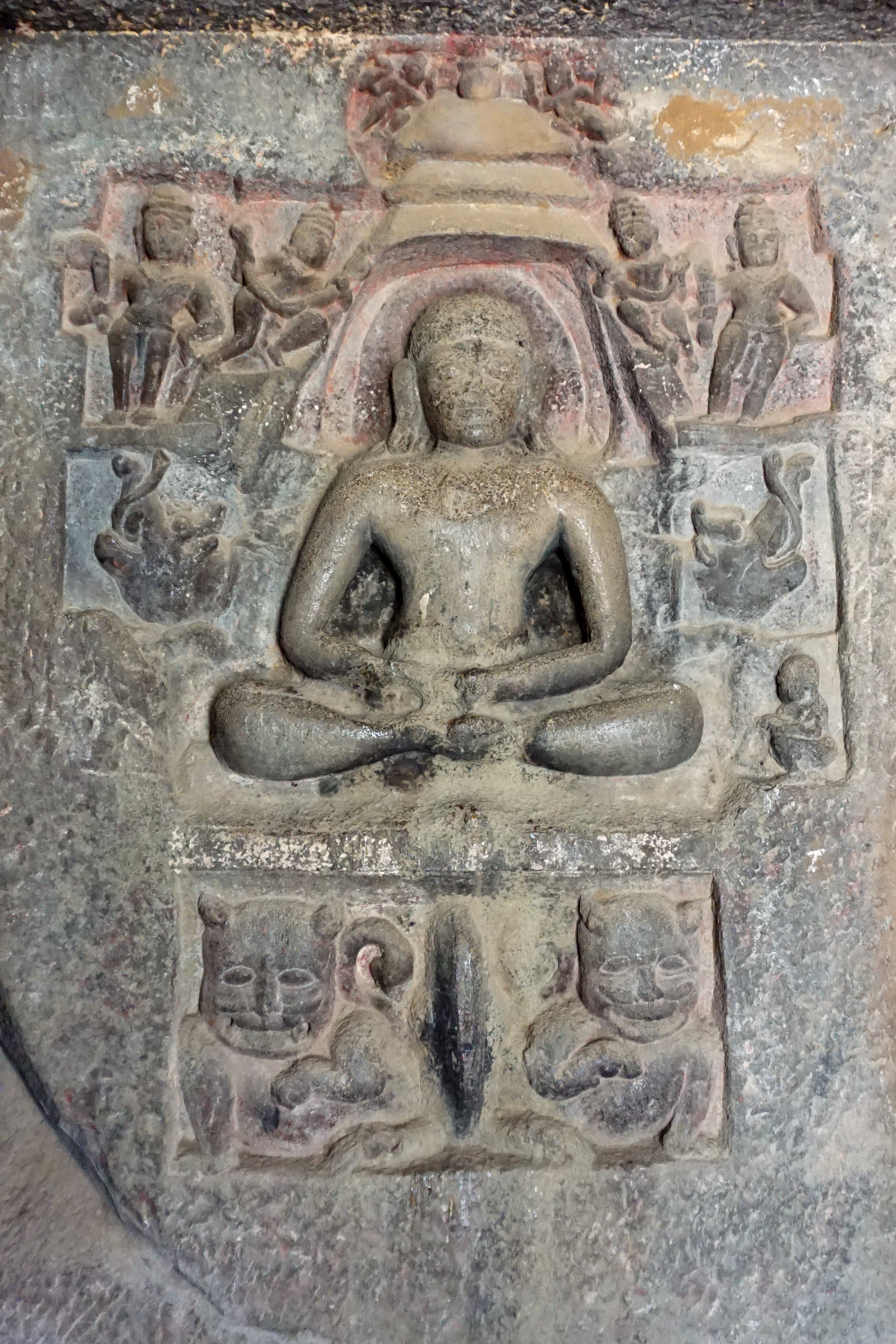
Cave 11, Jain reliefs

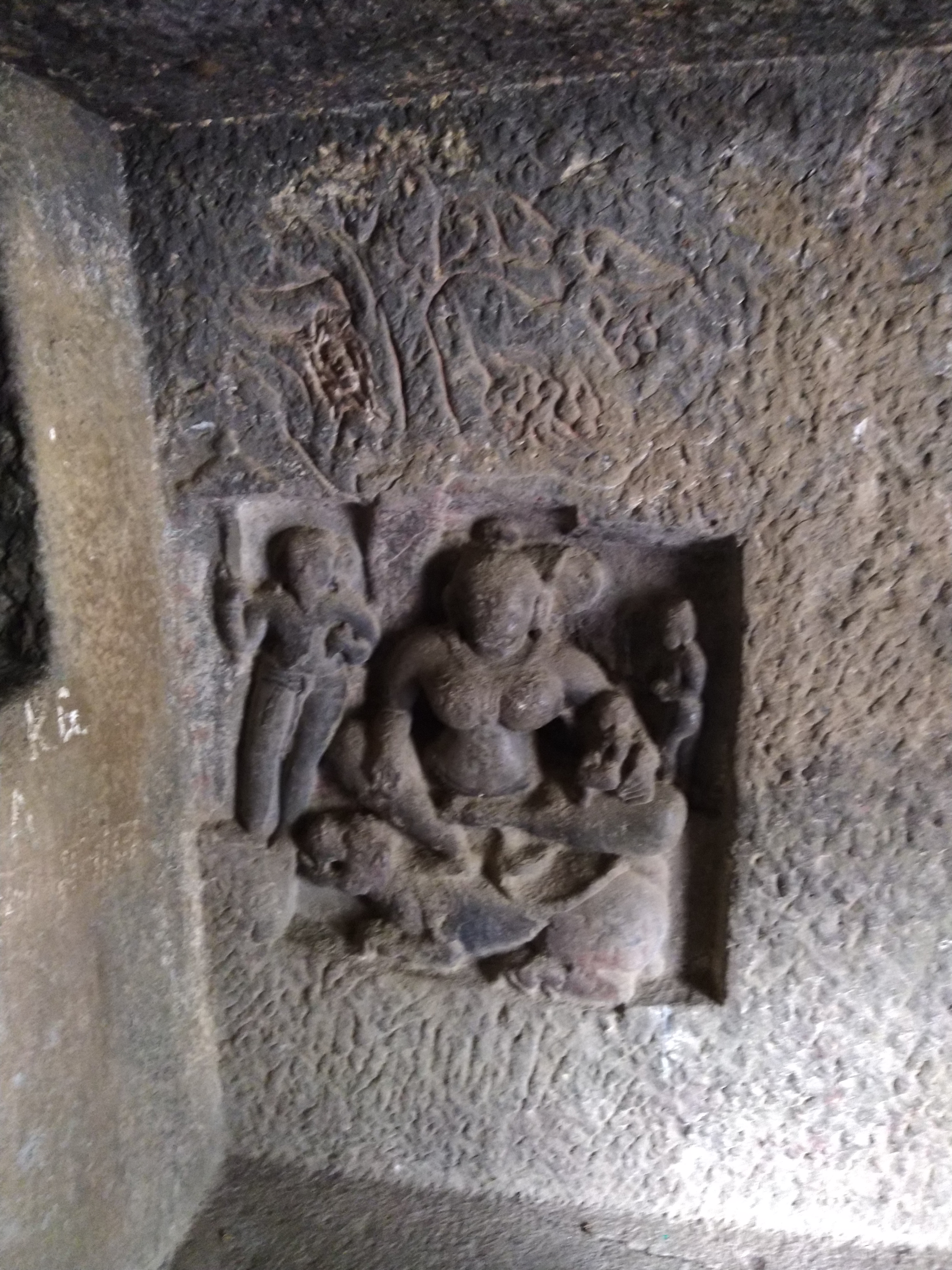
Cave 11, Relief of Ambika

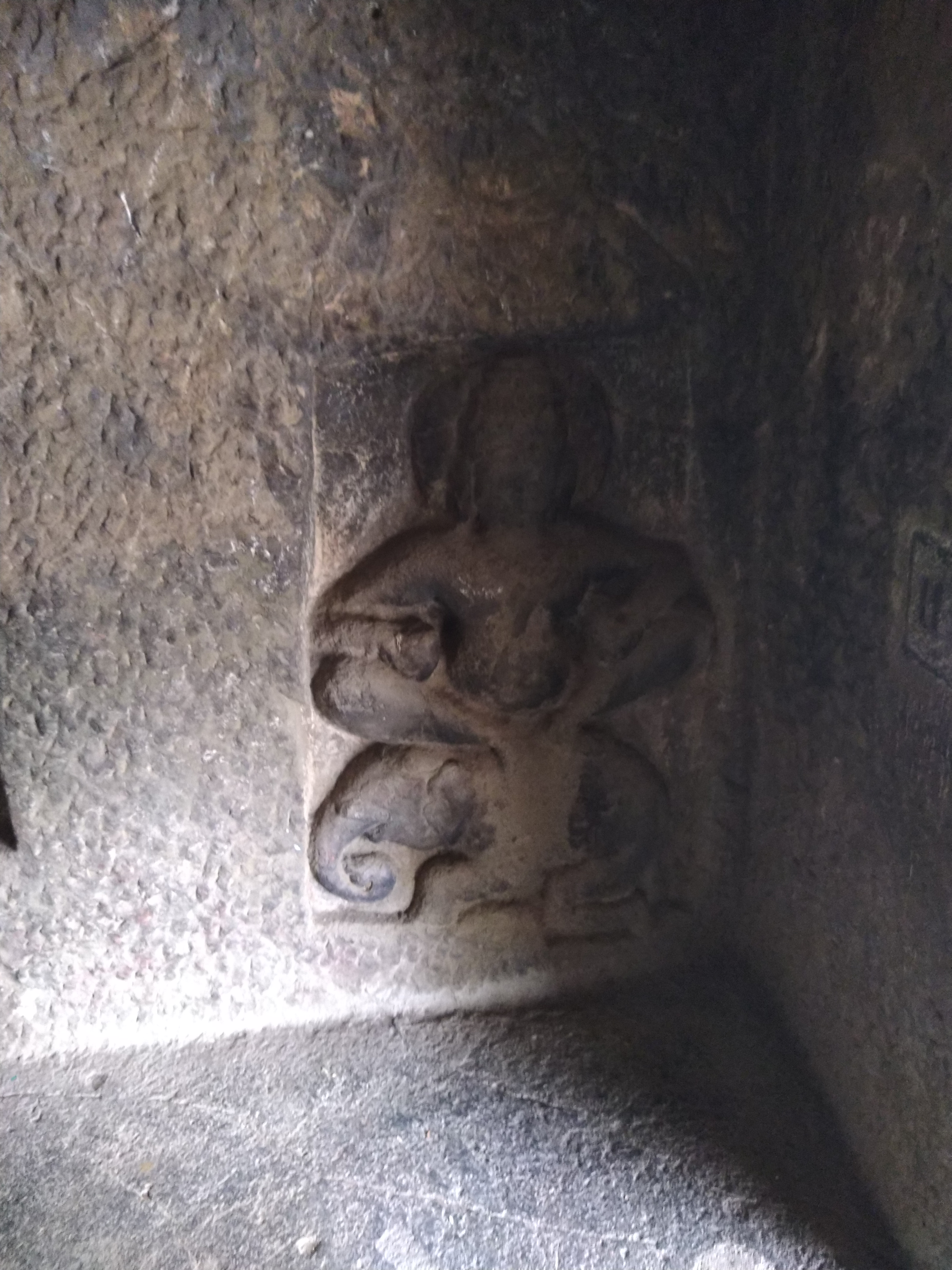
Cave 11, Relief of Indra

=== Caves No.12-16 ===
Cave No.12 has one inscription mentioning it is the gift of a merchant named Ramanaka. Cave No.13 has no inscriptions.

Caves No.12-13-14
This is a group of chambers, probably the remains of three bhikshugrihas or hermitages, with one, two, and three cells respectively. The first has an inscription of a certain Hamanaka, mentioning an endowment of 100 karshapanas for "a garment to the ascetic residing in it during the rains". To the left is a tank, and then for thirty yards everything has been blasted and quarried away.

There are no inscriptions in the other two caves.

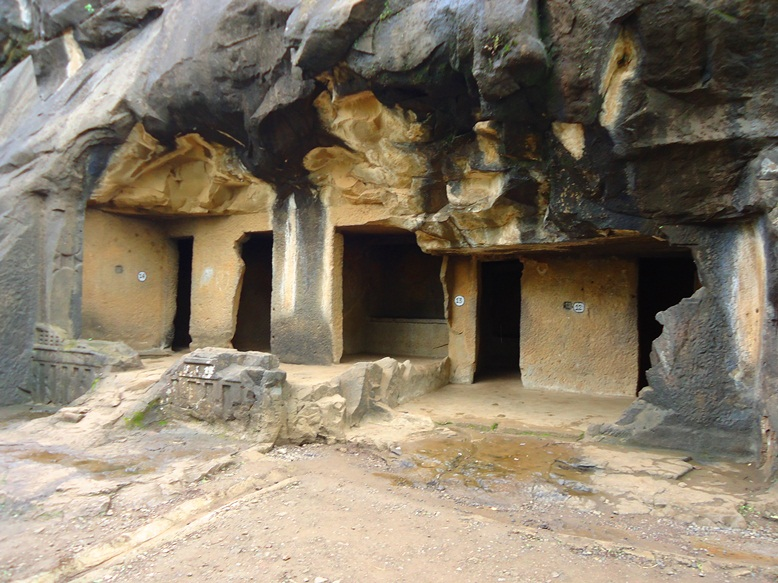
Caves 12, 13 and Cave 14 (extreme left)

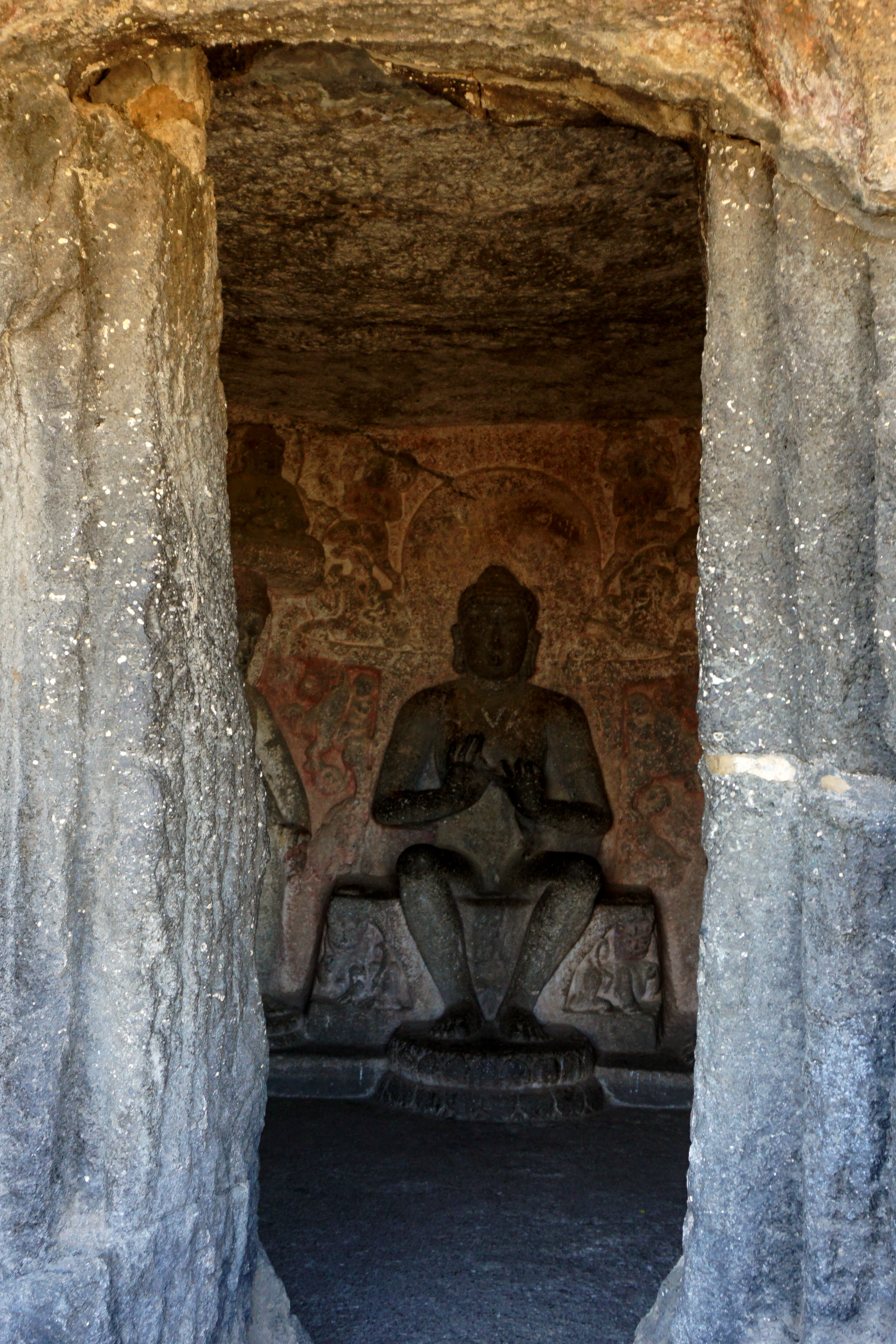
Caves 14, exterior

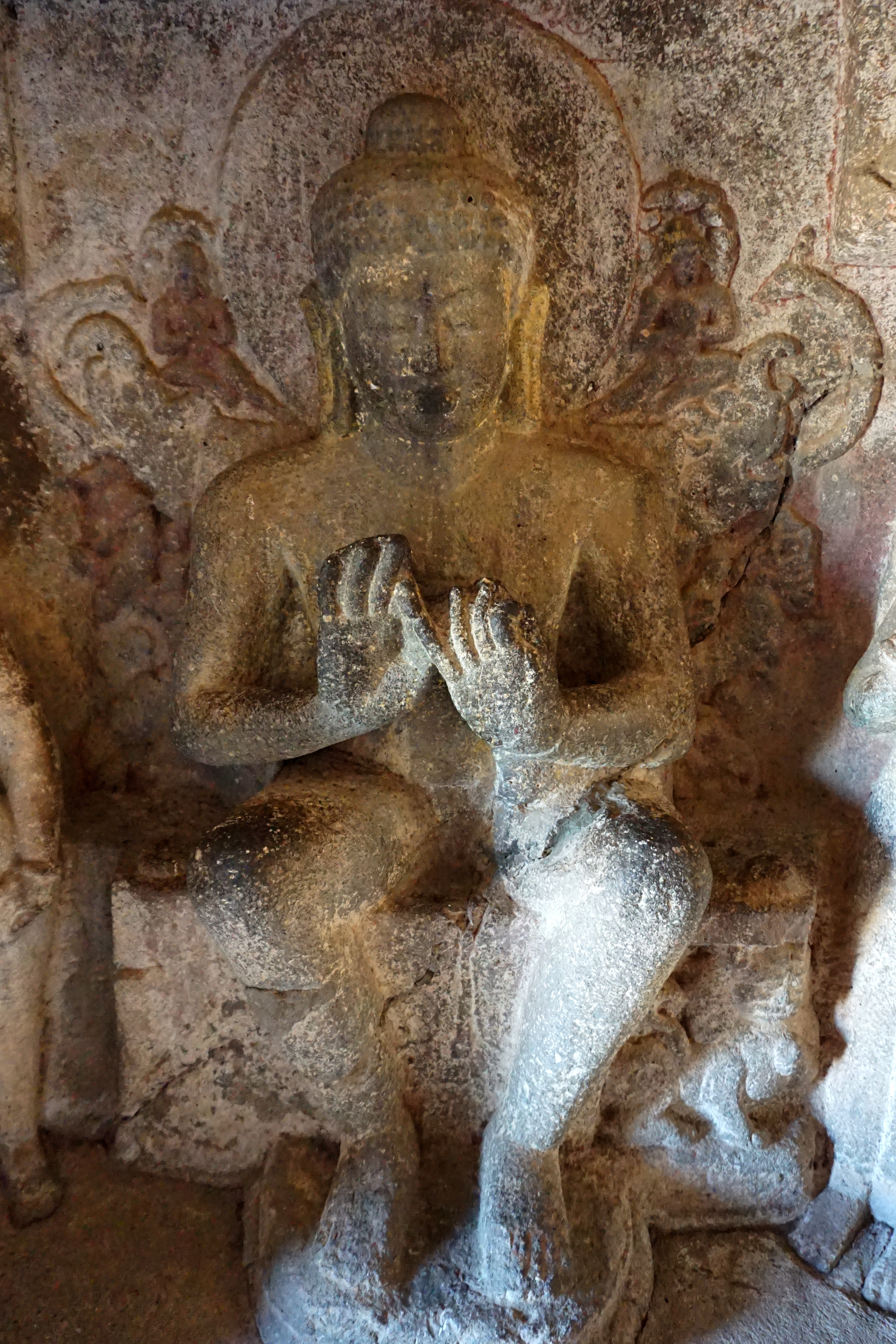
Cave 14, Buddha sitting

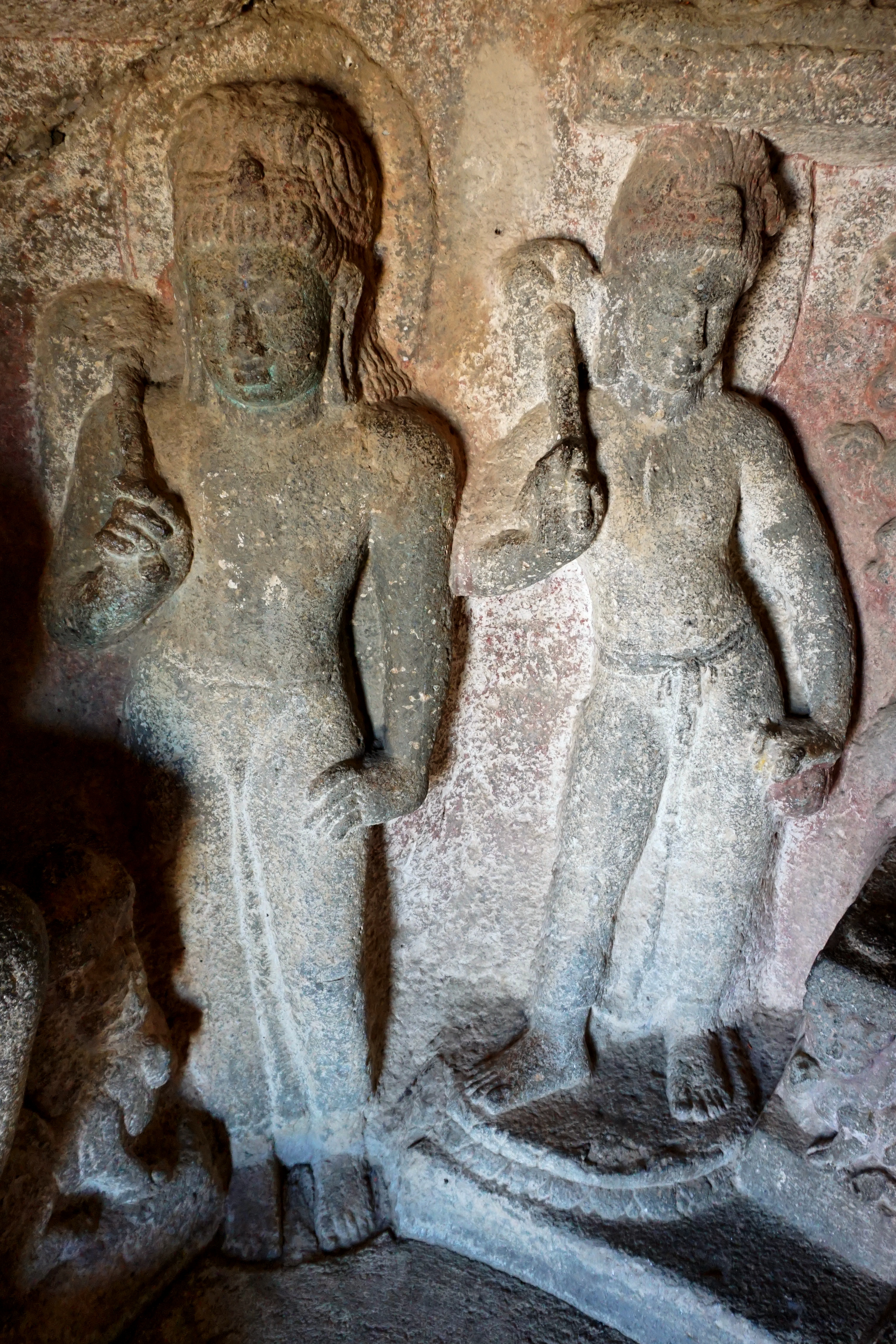
Cave 14, Bodhisattvas

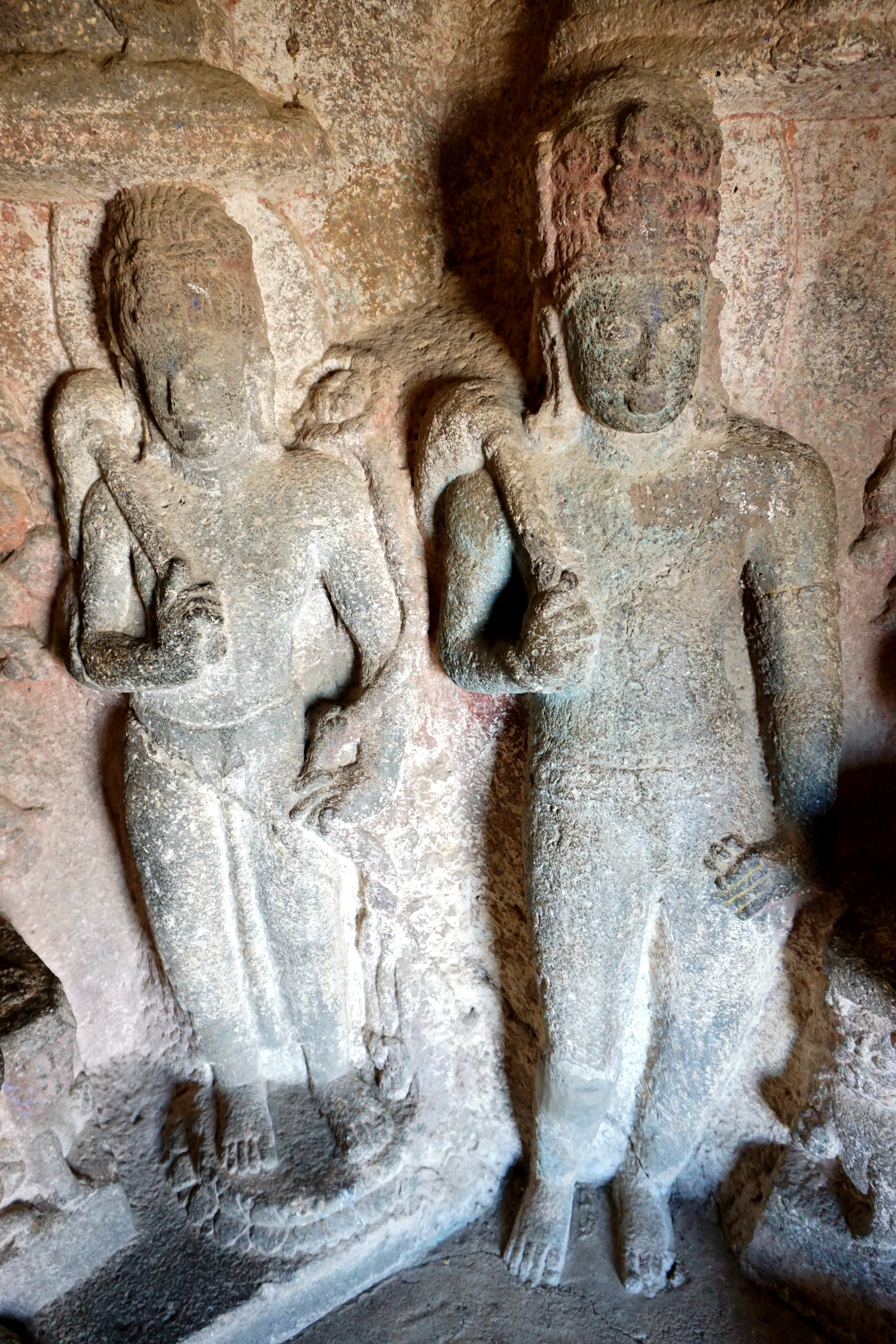
Cave 14, Bodhisattvas

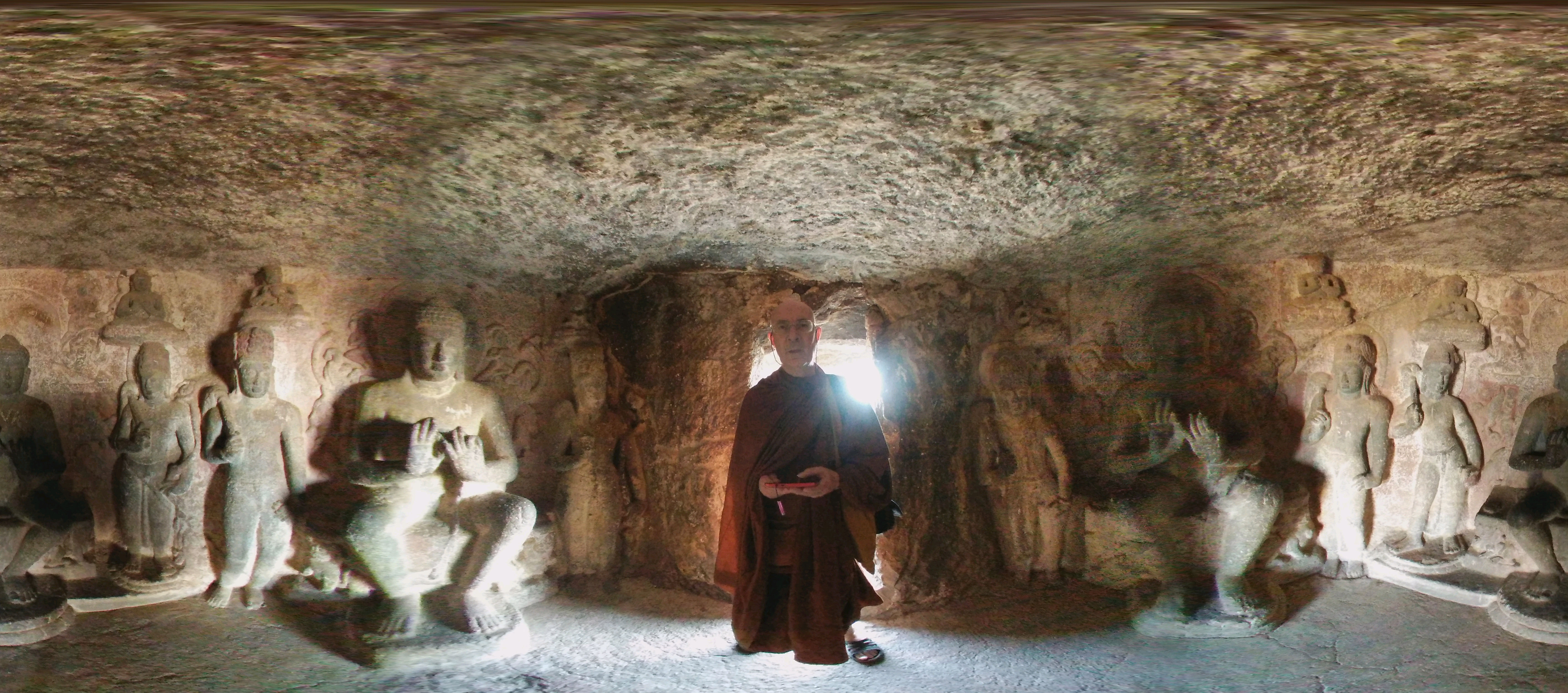
Cave 14, interior panorama

Cave No.15
Cave No.15 seems to be only the inner shrines of a two-storeyed cave, the whole front of which has disappeared, and the upper is only accessible by a ladder. Both have on each of their three walls a sitting Buddha with the usual standing attendants, similar to what we find in Caves No.2 and 23, and in the later Ajanta Caves. These are, apparently, Mahayana works. Beyond them, another fifty feet has been quarried away by blasting, which has been continued along the outer portion of the terrace of Cave No.17.

There are no inscriptions in this cave.

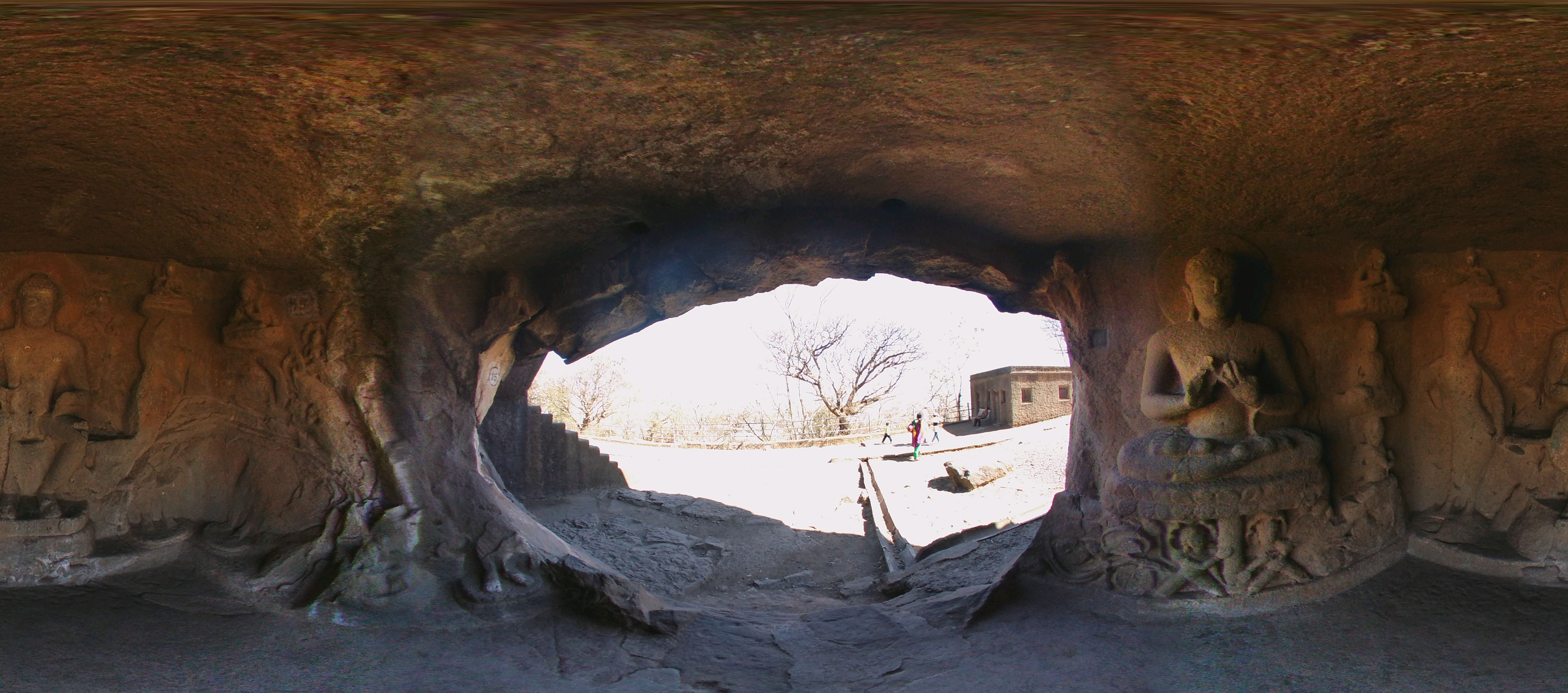
Interior panorama

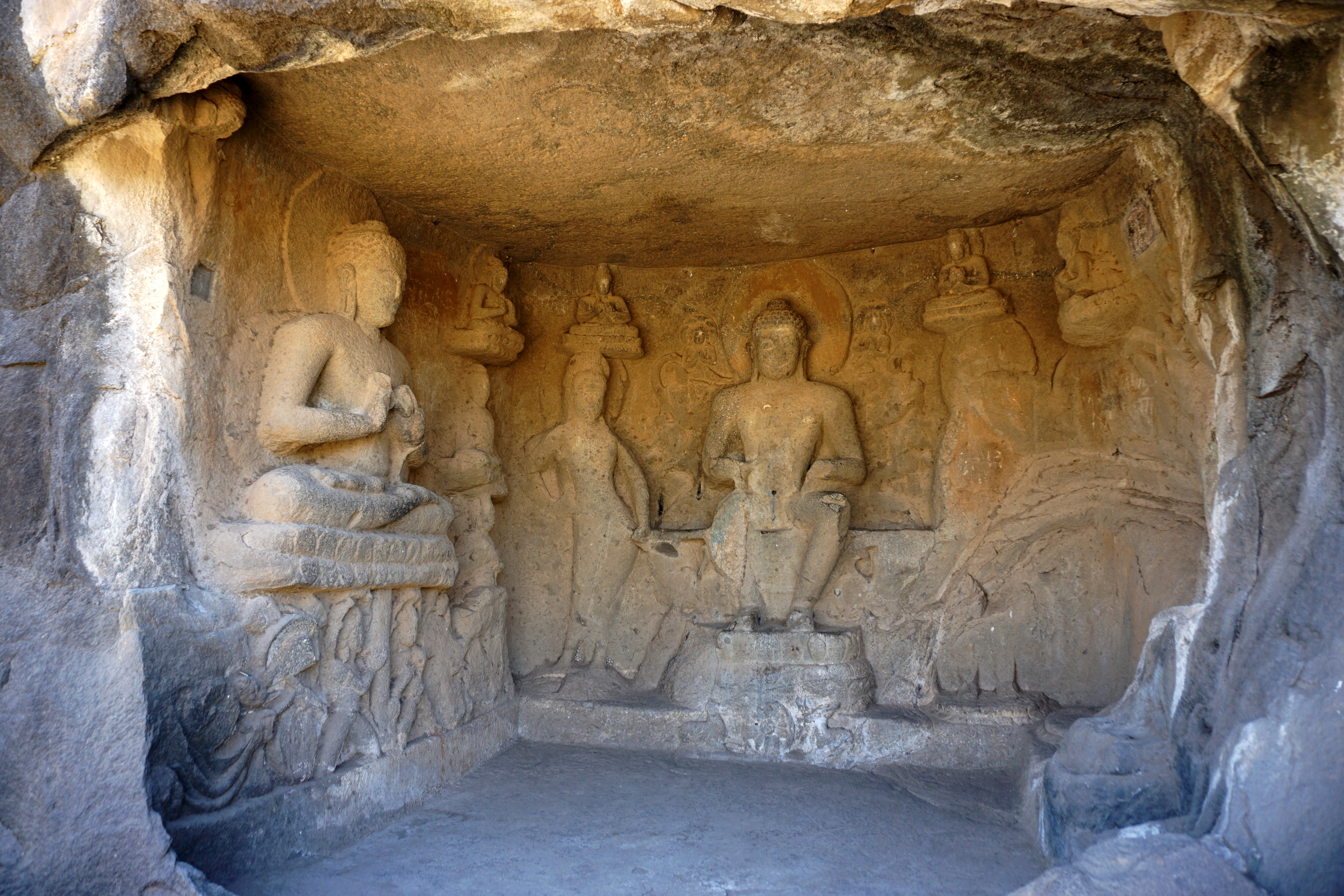
Front

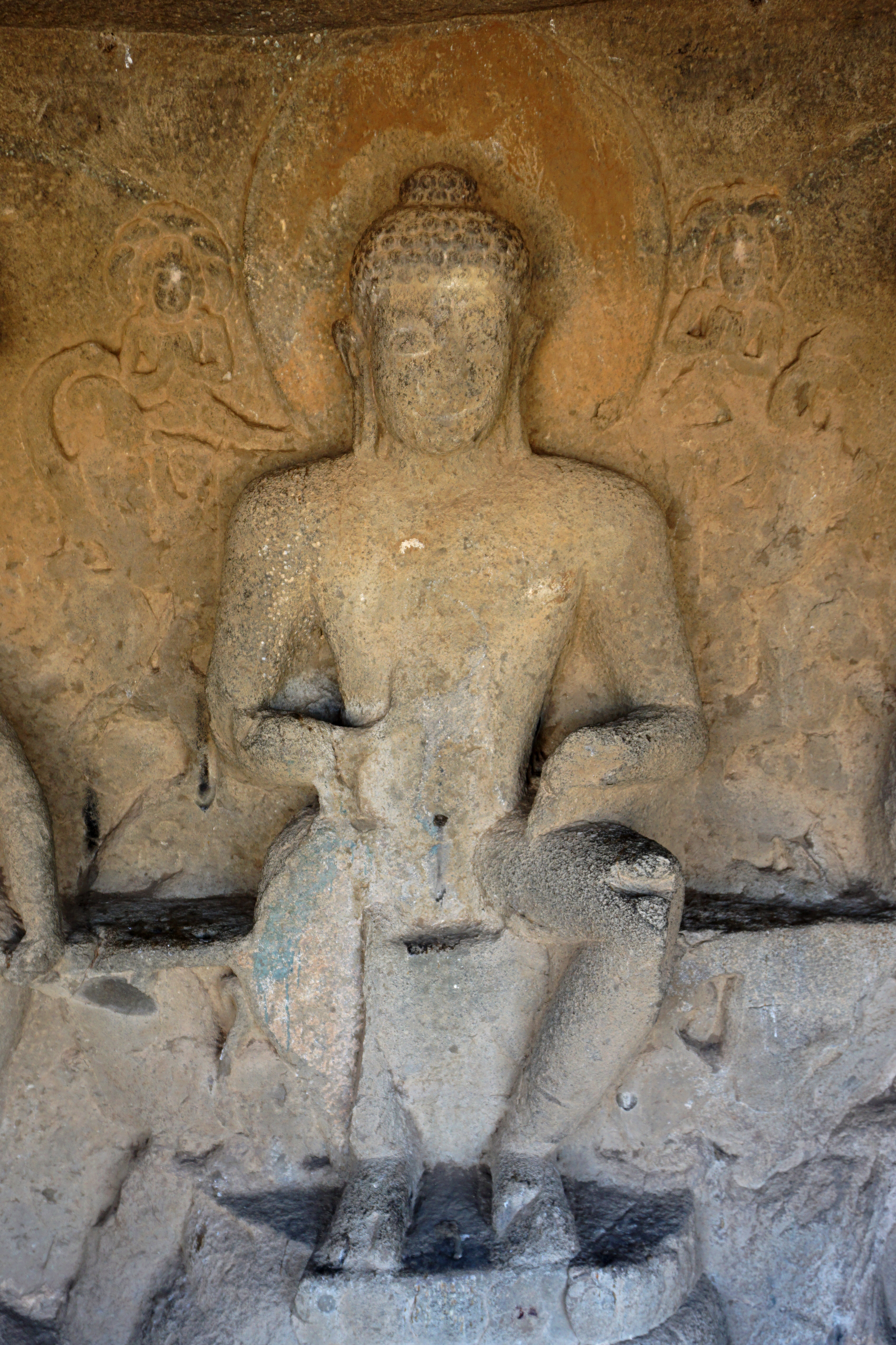
Buddha

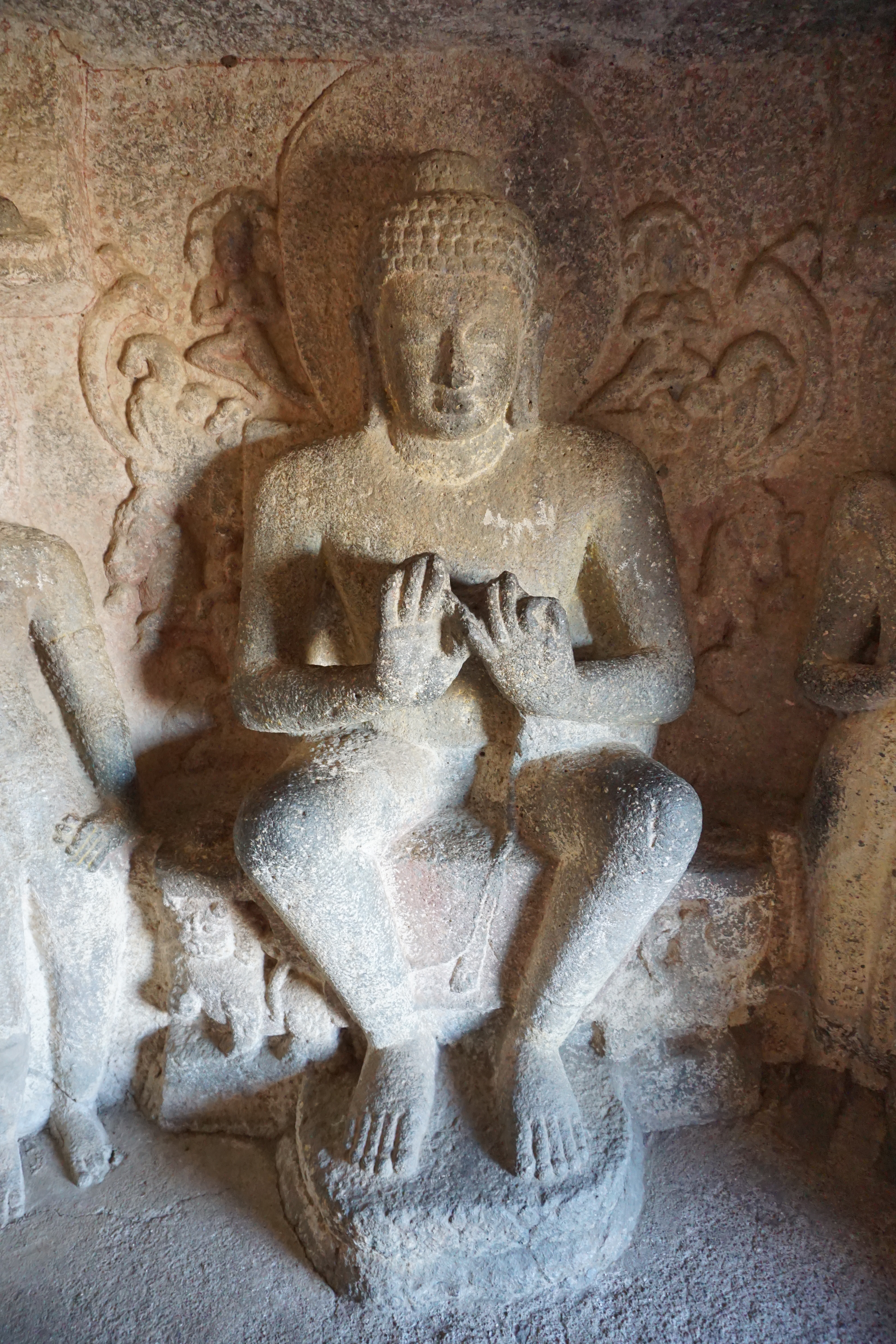
Seated and Teaching Buddha

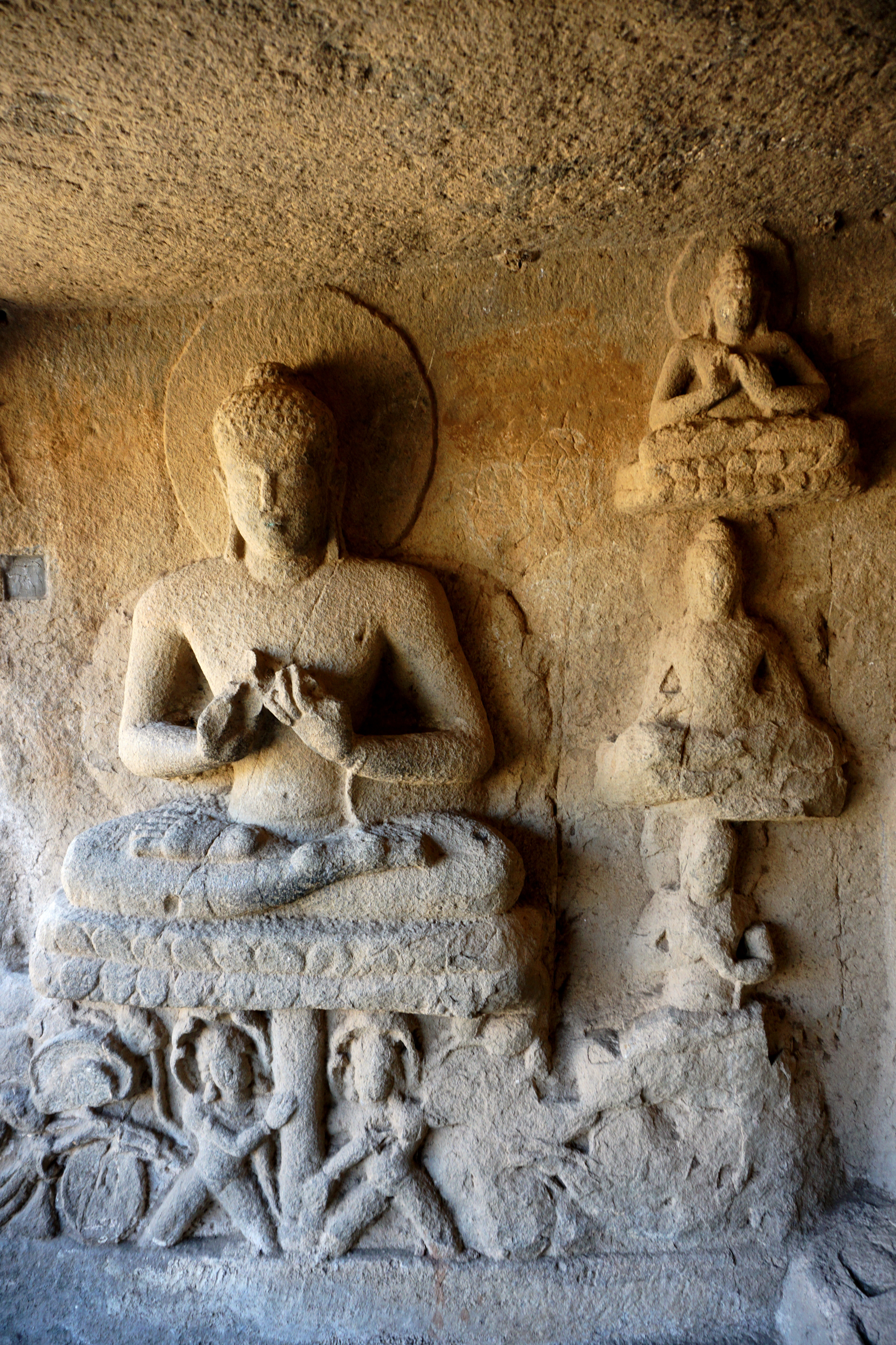

Cave No.16
There are no inscriptions in this cave.

=== Cave No.17, "Yavana vihara" (circa 120 CE) ===
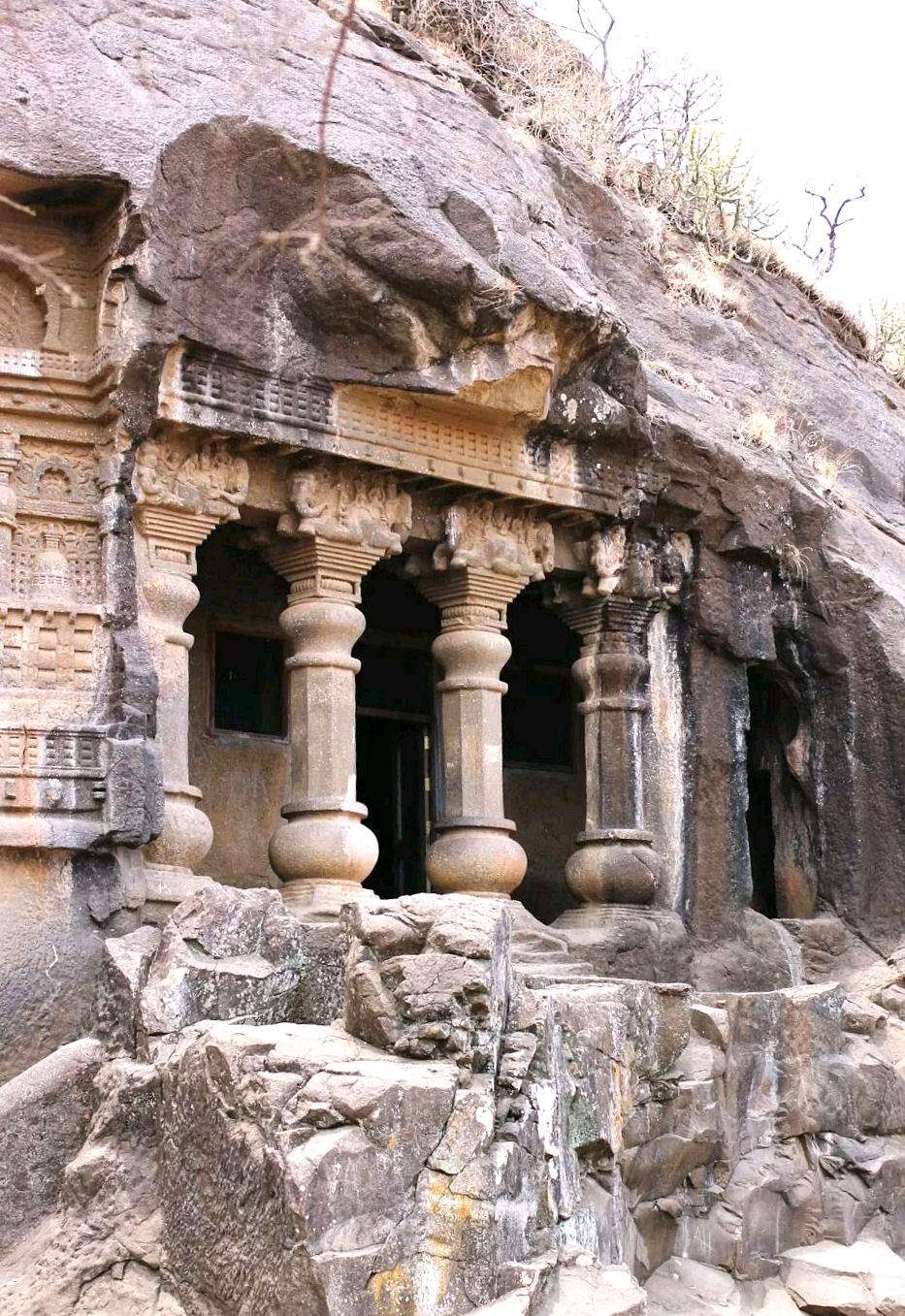
Cave No.17, "Yavana vihara" (circa 120 CE). 3D tour.

Cave No.17 was built by a devotee of Greek descent, who presents his father as being a Yavana from the northern city of Demetriapolis. The cave is dated to around 120 CE.

==== The cave ====
Inside hall

Cave 17 is the third large Vihara, though smaller than Nos.3, 10, 20, and has been executed close to the upper portion of the Chaitya cave. The hall measures 22 feet 10 inches wide by 32 feet 2 inches deep, and has a back aisle screened off by two columns, of which the elephants and their riders and the thin square members of the capitals only are finished. The steps of the shrine door have also been left as a rough block, on which a Hindu has carved the shalunkha, or receptacle for a linga. The shrine has never been finished. On the wall of the back aisle is a standing figure of Buddha, 3.5 feet high; in the left side of the hall, 2 feet 3 inches from the floor, is a recess, 18.5 feet long and 4 feet 3 inches high by 2 feet deep, intended for a seat or perhaps for a row of metallic images; a cell has been attempted at each end of this, but one of them has entered the aisle of the Chaitya-cave just below, and the work has then been stopped. On the right side are four cells without benches.

Veranda

The veranda is somewhat peculiar, and it would seem that, at first, a much smaller cave was projected, or else by some mistake it was begun too far to the left. It is ascended by half a-dozen steps in front between the two central octagonal pillars with very short shafts, and large bases and capitals, the latter surmounted by elephants and their riders, and the frieze above carved with the plain "rail pattern". They stand on a paneled base; but the landing between the central pair is opposite the left window in the back wall of the veranda, to the right of which is the principal door, but to the left of the window is also a narrower one. The veranda has then been prolonged to the west, and another door broken out to the outside beyond the right attached pillar; at this end of the veranda also is an unfinished cell.

Comparisons

The cave is later than the Chaitya next it, and the veranda a little later in style than the Nahapana Cave No.10. The interior with an image of the Buddha, was probably executed at a later date, around the 6th century CE. Fergusson states later in his book that, from an architectural standpoint, Cave No.17 is contemporary with the Great Chatya at the Karla Caves, but is actually a bit earlier in style than Cave No.10 of Nahapana at Nasik, but at no great interval of time.

Cave No.17, "Yavana Vihara", circa 120 CE
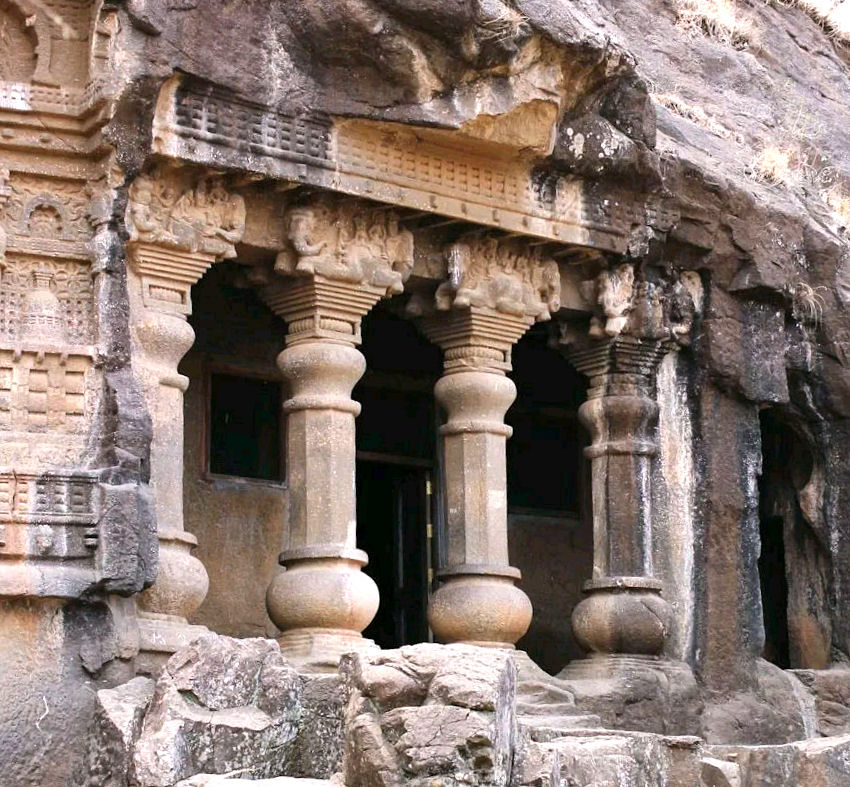
Exterior

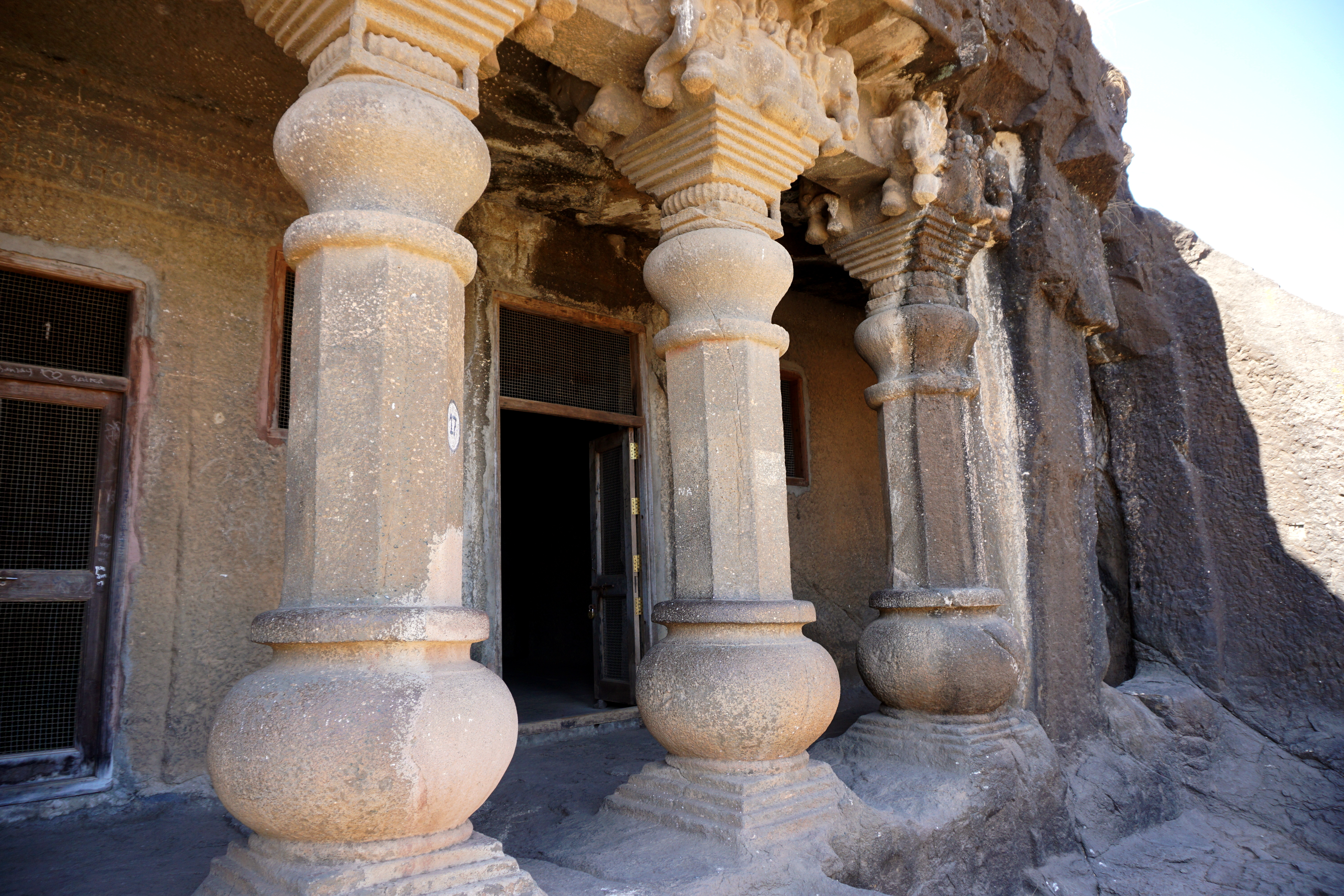
Entrance. The inscription is visible, in part, over the entrance.

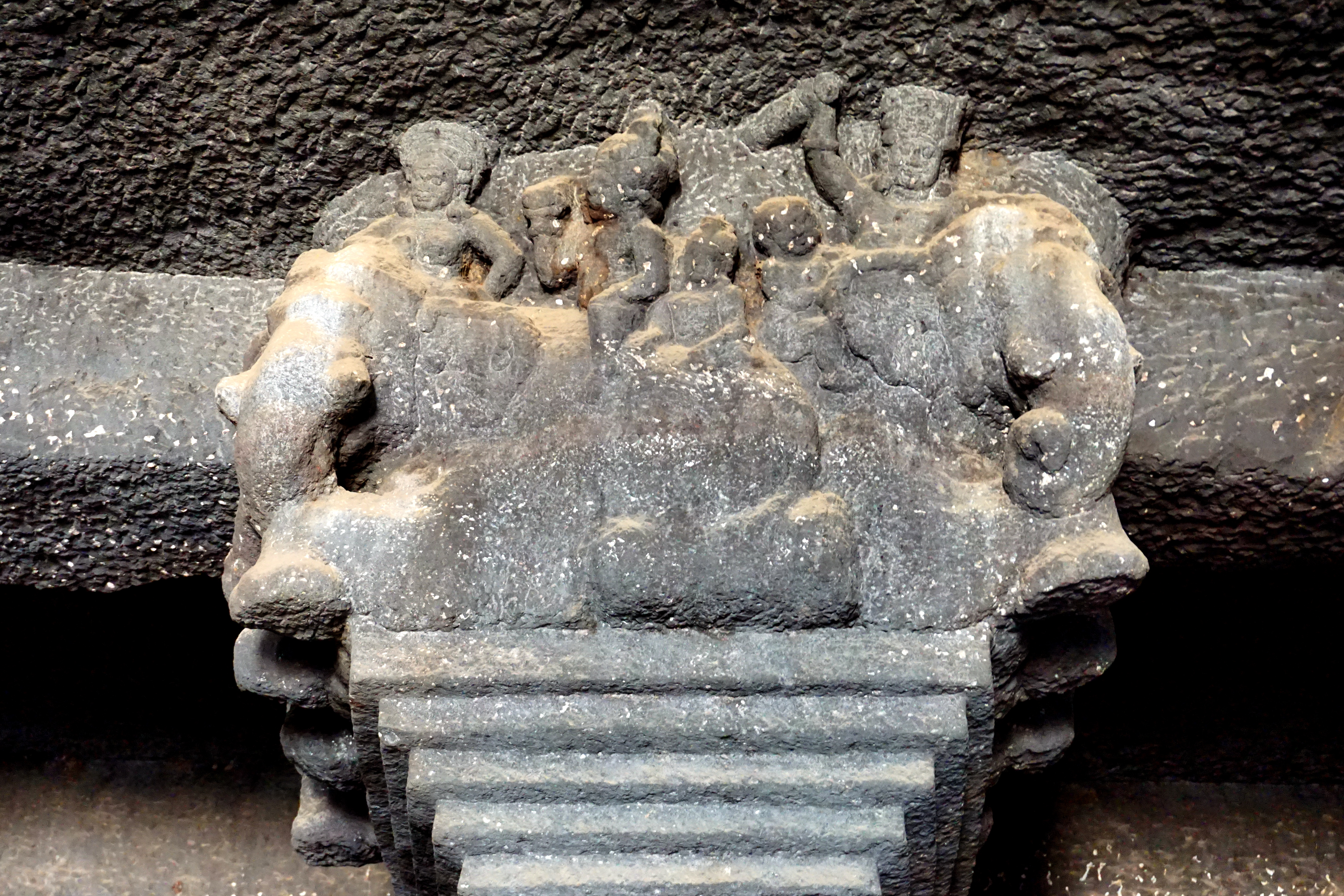
Pillar capital

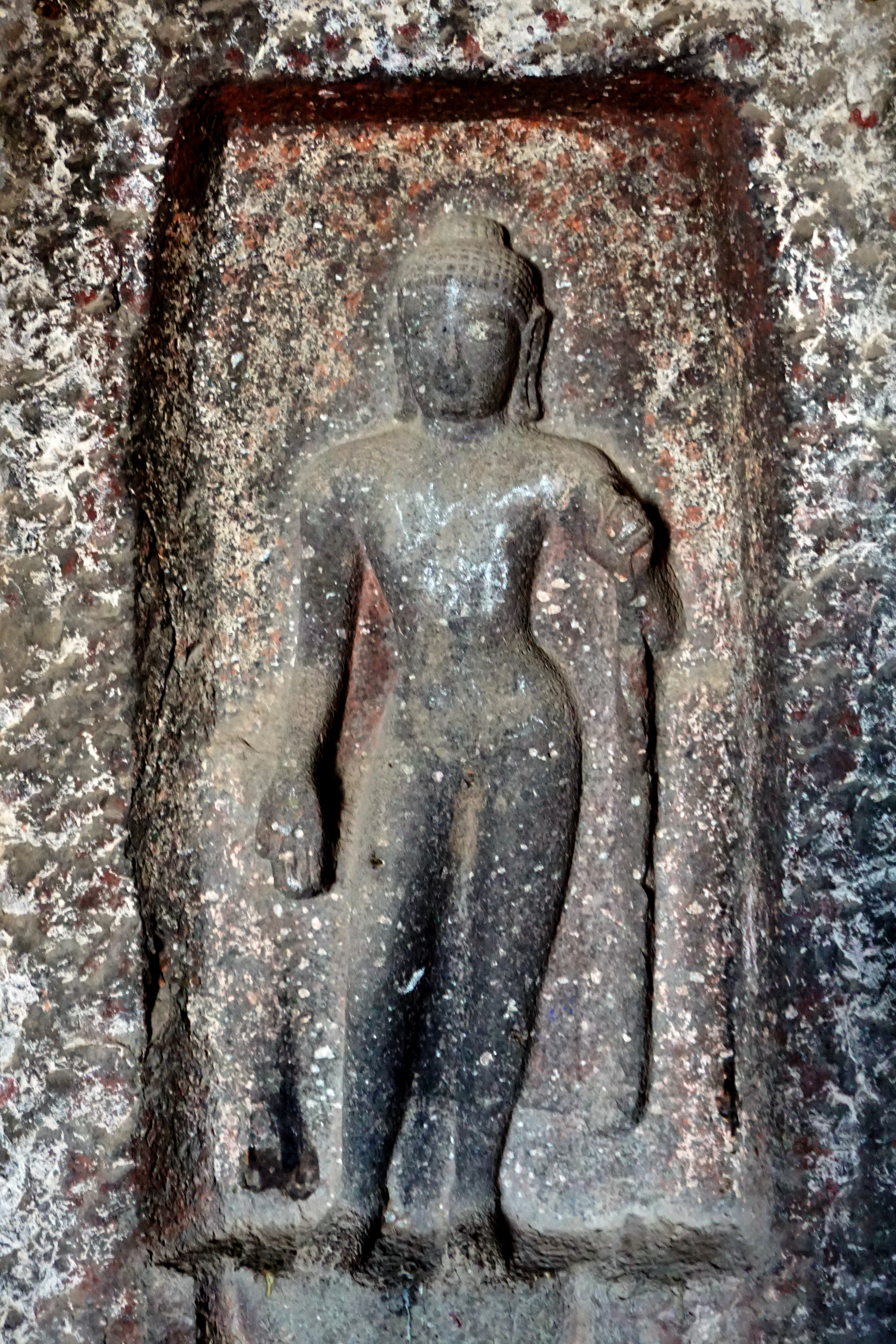
Standing Buddha (a later addition).

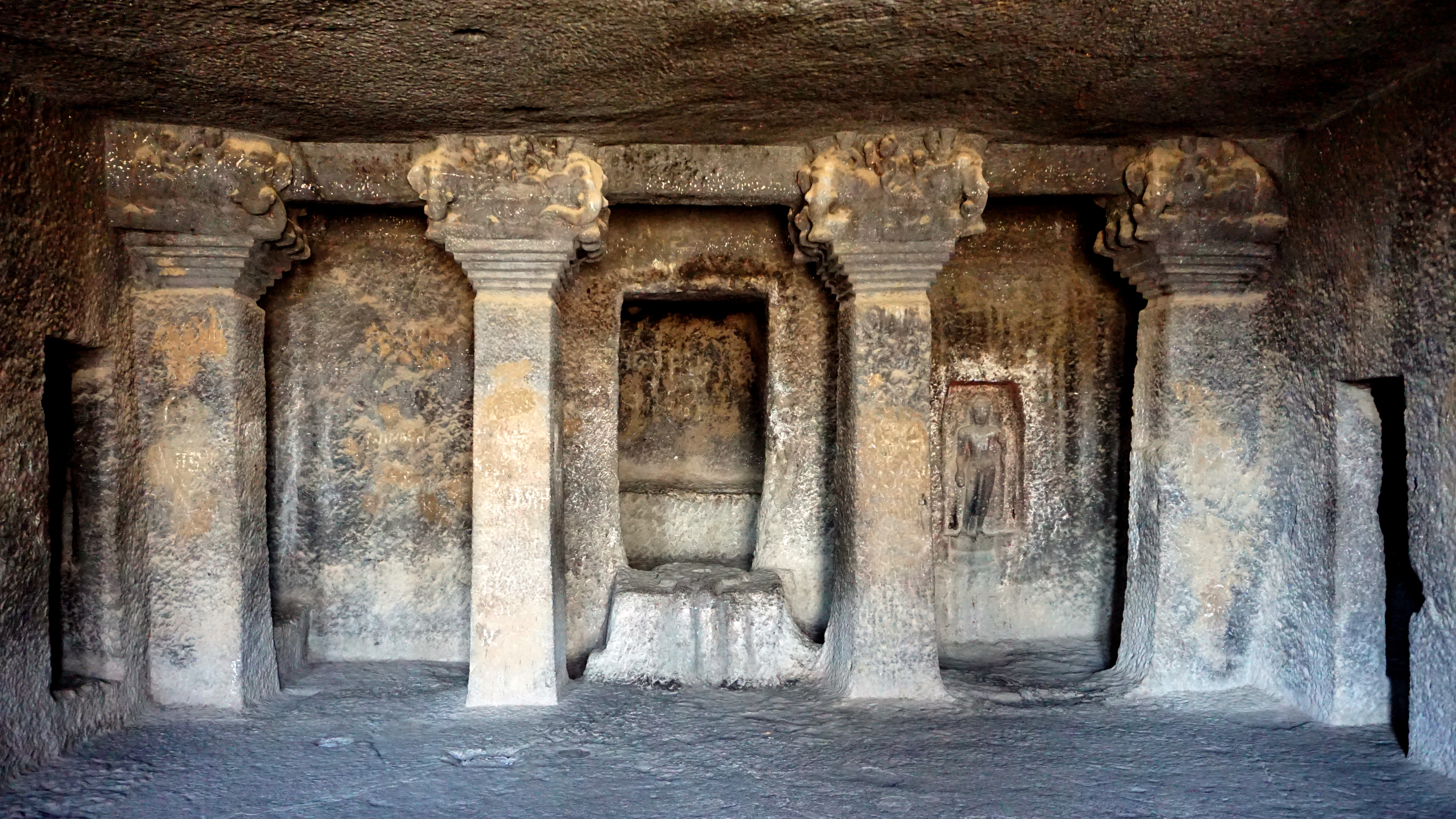
Interior

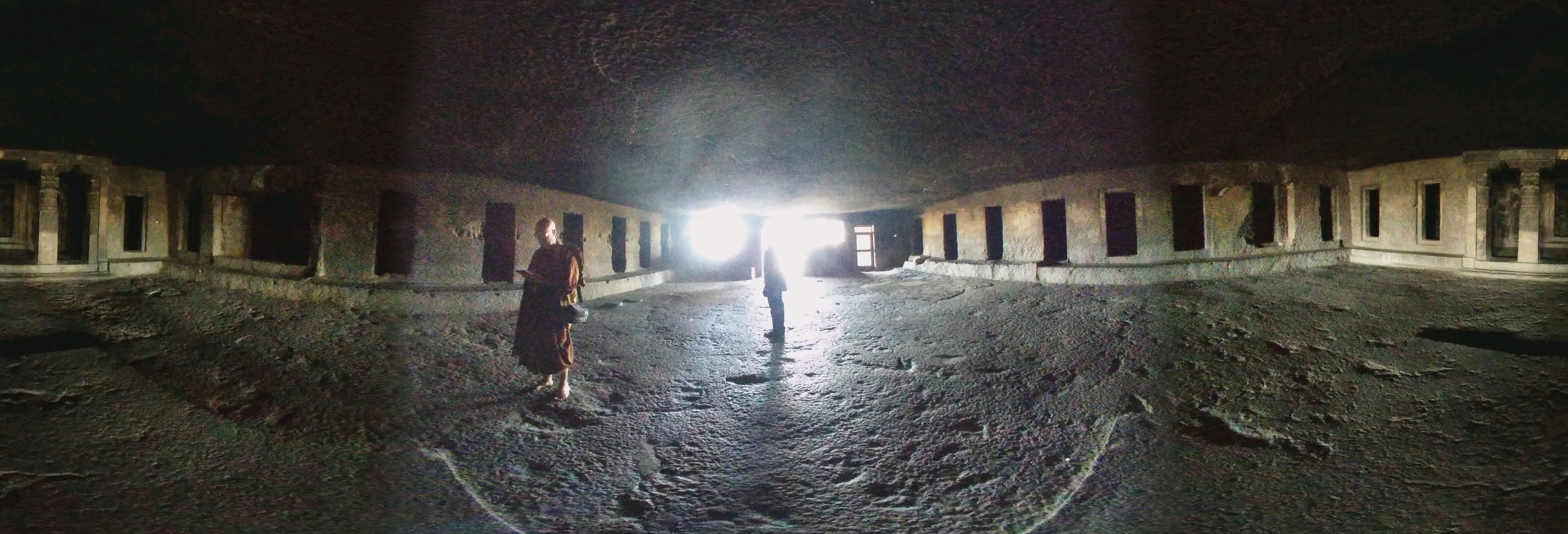
Interior panorama

==== Inscription ====
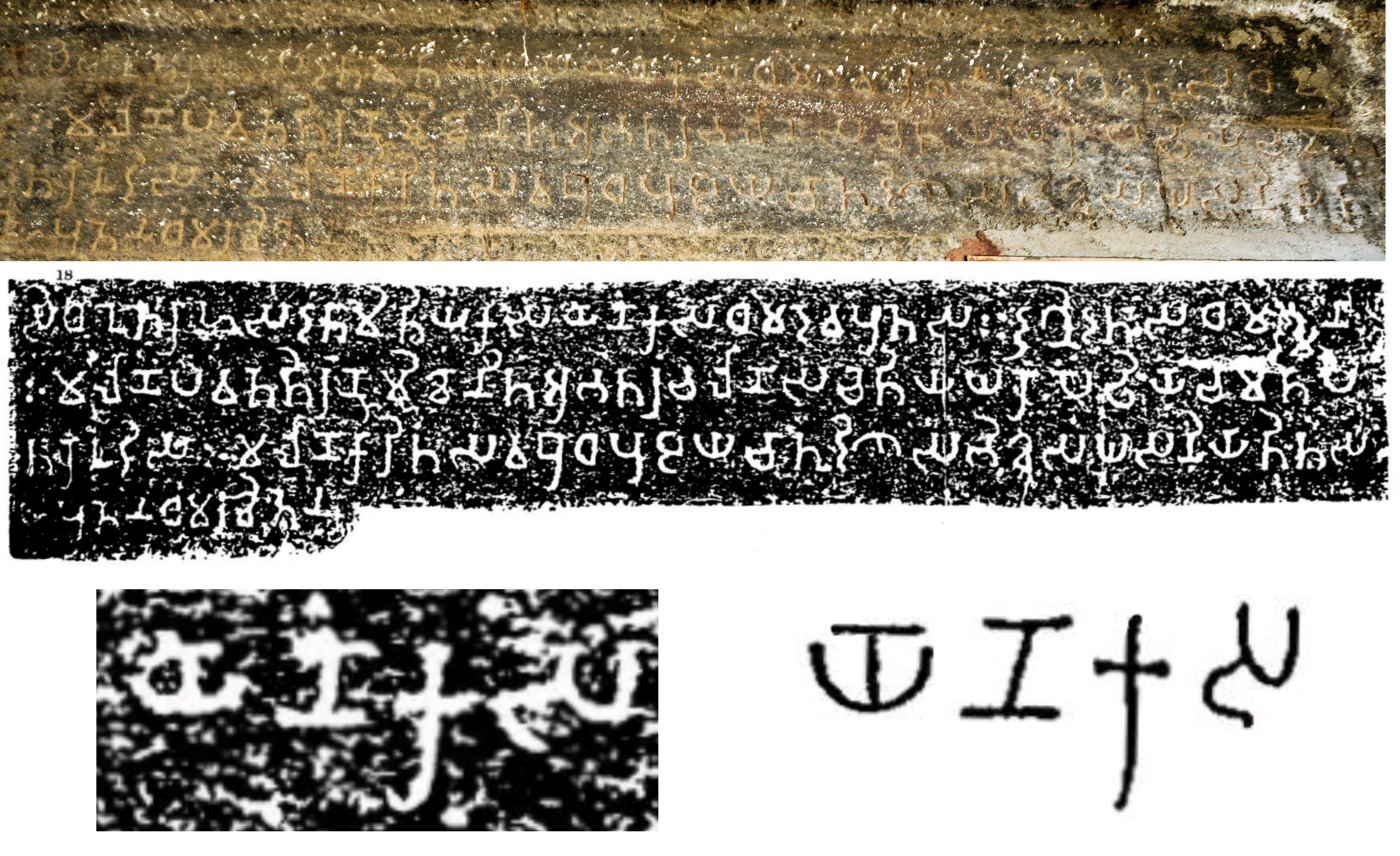
The "Yavana" inscription on the back wall of the veranda, over the entrance, is about 3 meters in length (photograph and rubbing). Detail of the word "Yo-ṇa-ka-sa" (adjectival form of "Yoṇaka", Brahmi), with Nasik/Karla-period Brahmi script for reference.

Cave No.17 has one inscription, mentioning the gift of the cave by Indragnidatta the son of the Yavana (i.e. Greek or Indo-Greek) Dharmadeva. It is located on the back wall of the veranda, over the main entrance, and is inscribed in large letters:

"Success! (The gift) of Indragnidatta, son of Dhammadeva, the Yavana, a northerner from Dattamittri. By him, inspired by true religion, this cave has been caused to be excavated in mount Tiranhu, and inside the cave a Chaitya and cisterns. This cave made for the sake of his father and mother has been, in order to honor all Buddhas bestowed on the universal Samgha by monks together with his son Dhammarakhita."

— Inscription No.18, in Cave No,17

The city of "Dattamittri" may be the city of Demetrias in Arachosia, mentioned by Isidore of Charax. This vihara is probably contemporary to the reign of Western Satrap Nahapana, circa 120 CE.
The word "Yoṇaka", which was the current Greek Hellenistic form, is used in the inscription, instead of "Yavana", which was the Indian word to designate the Indo-Greeks.
The Yavanas are also known for their donations with inscriptions at the Great Chaitya at the Karla Caves, and at the Manmodi Caves in Junnar.

=== Cave No. 18: the Chaitya ===
==== The cave ====
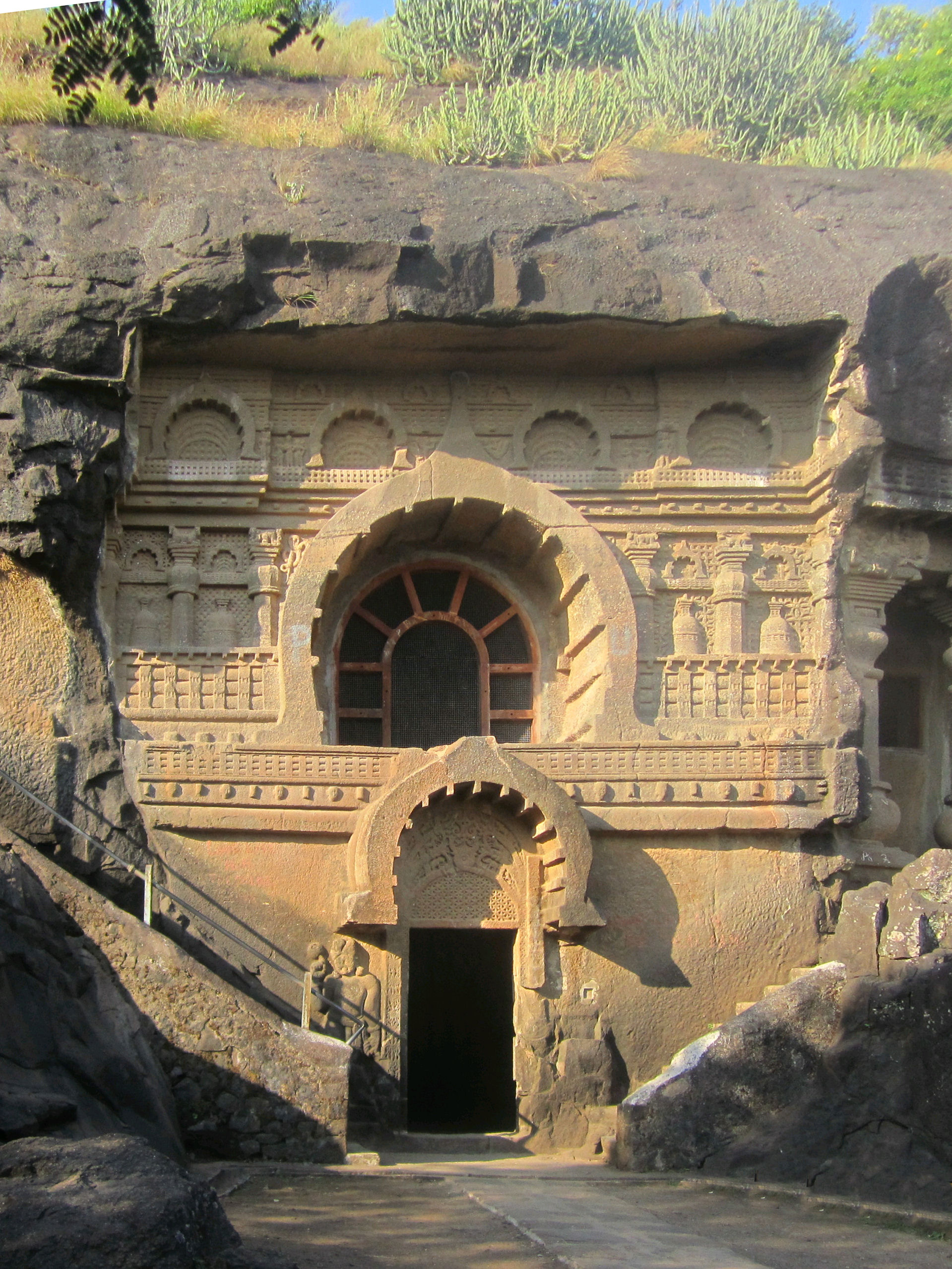
Cave No.18, the corner of cave No.17 is visible on the right. 3D tour.

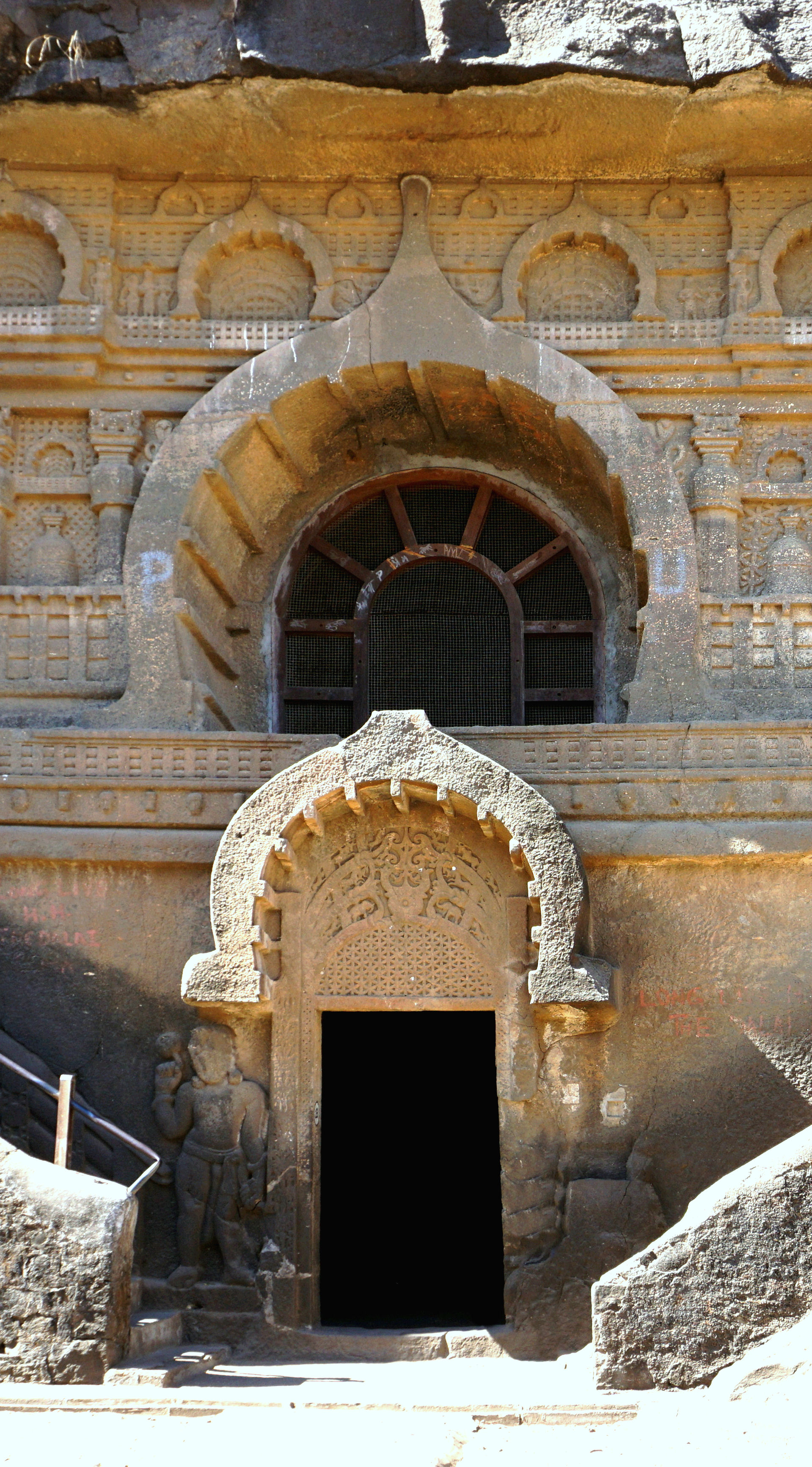
Cave No.18 doorway.

Cave No.18 is a chaitya design, comparable to the Karla Caves Chaitya, although earlier and much smaller and simpler in design. It is the only Chaitya cave of the group, belongs to a much earlier date; and though none of the three inscriptions on it supplies certain information on this point, yet the name of Maha Hakusiri, found in one of them, tends to push it back to some period about or before the Christian era. The carving, however, over the door and the pilasters with animal capitals on the façade on each side the great arch, and the insertion of the hooded snake, will, on comparison with the façades at Bedsa and Karla, tend to suggest an early date for this cave.

Chronology

Chaitya No. 18 participates to a chronology of several other Chaitya caves which were built in Western India under royal sponsorship. It is thought that the chronology of these early Chaitya Caves is as follows: first Cave 9 at Kondivite Caves, then Cave 12 at the Bhaja Caves and Cave 10 of Ajanta Caves, around the 1st century BCE. Then, in chronological order: Cave 3 at Pitalkhora, Cave 1 at Kondana Caves, Cave 9 at Ajanta Caves, which, with its more ornate designs, may have been built about a century later, Only then appears Cave 18 at Nasik Caves, to be followed by Cave 7 at Bedse Caves, and finally by the "final perfection" of the Great Chaitya at Karla Caves (circa 120 CE).

Doorway

The doorway is evidently of an early date, and the ornament up the left side is almost identical with that found on the pillars of the northern gateway at Sanchi, with which it consequently is in all probability coeval (1st century CE). The carving over the doorway, which represents the wooden framework which filled all openings, of a similar class, at that age, is of a much more ornamental character than usual, or than the others shown on this facade. Animals are introduced as in the Lomas Rishi. So also are the trisulas and shield emblems, in a very ornamental form, but almost identical with those existing in the Manmodi cave at Junnar, which is probably of about the same age as this Chaitya.

Hall

The interior measures 38 feet 10 inches by 21 feet 7 inches, and the nave, from the door up to the dagoba, 25 feet 4 inches by 10 feet, and 23 feet 3 inches high. The cylinder of the dagoba is 5.5 feet in diameter and 6 feet 3 inches high, surmounted by a small dome and very heavy capital. The gallery under the great arch of the window is supported by two pillars, which in all cases in the Chaitya caves are in such a form as strongly to suggest that a wooden frame was fastened between them, probably to hold a screen, which would effectually shut in the nave from observation from outside. Five octagonal pillars, with high bases of the Karle pattern but without capitals, on each side the nave, and five without bases round the dagoba, divide off the side aisles.

The woodwork that once occupied the front arch, and the roof of the nave has long ago disappeared. Whether there ever were pillars in advance of the present facade as at Bedsa, or a screen as at Karle, cannot be determined with certainty, unless by excavating largely among the debris in front. There was probably something of the kind, but the Viharas, inserted so close to it on either side, must have hastened the ruin of the side walls of it.

Cave No.18, Chaitya
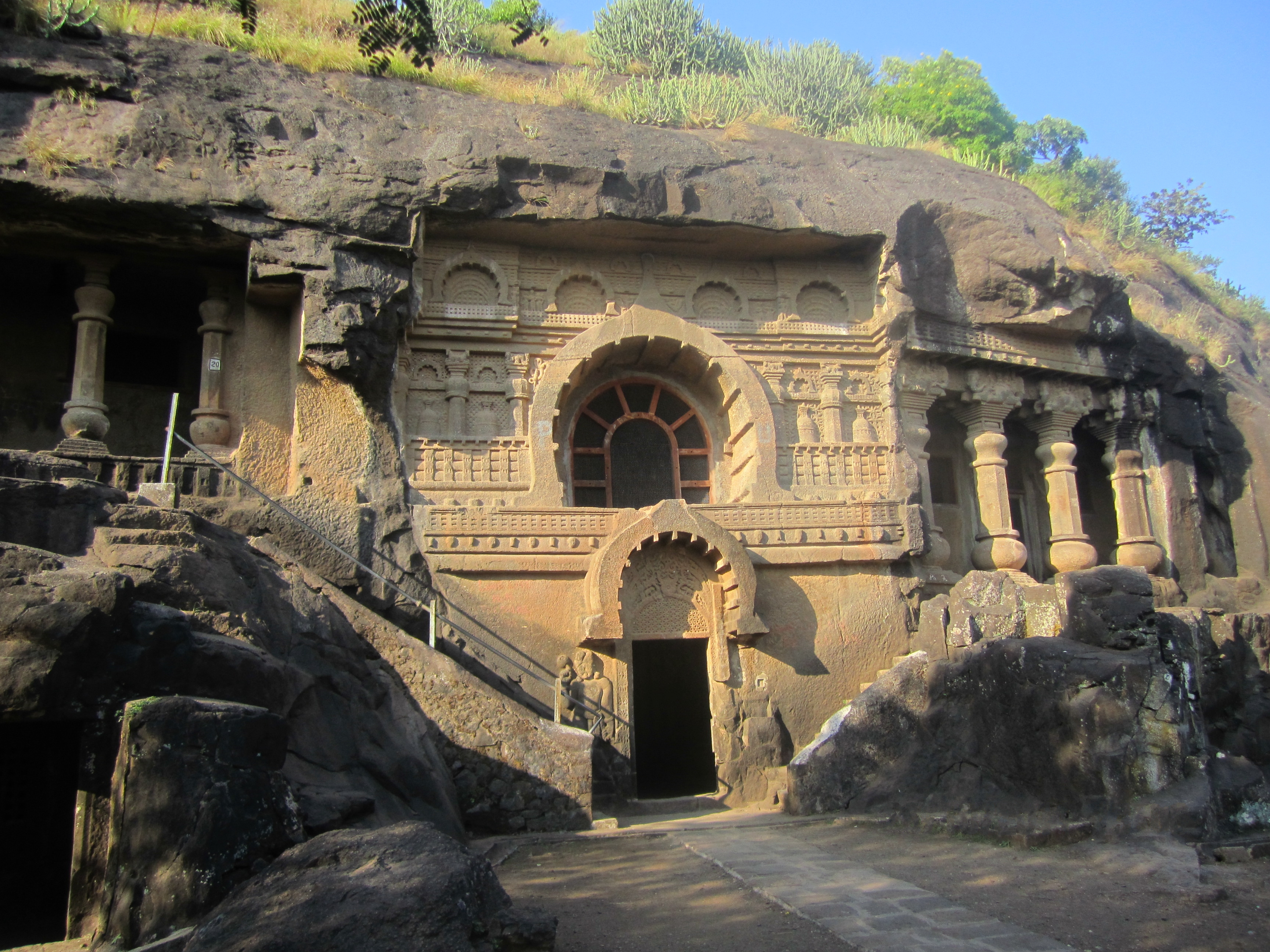
Exterior of cave No.18. Cave No.17 is visible on the right, cave No.20 on the left, and a corner of cave No,19 bottom left.

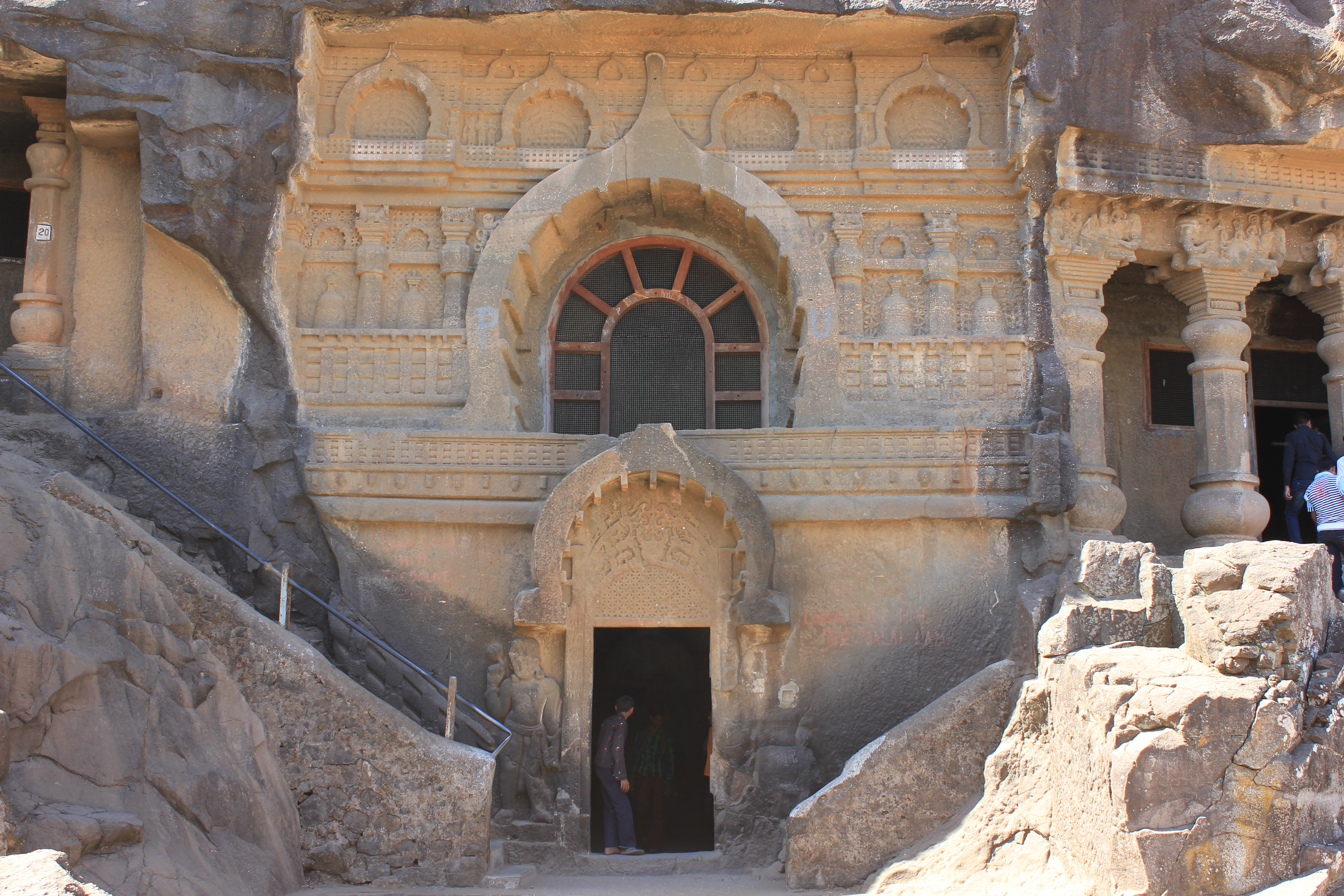
Entrance of cave 18

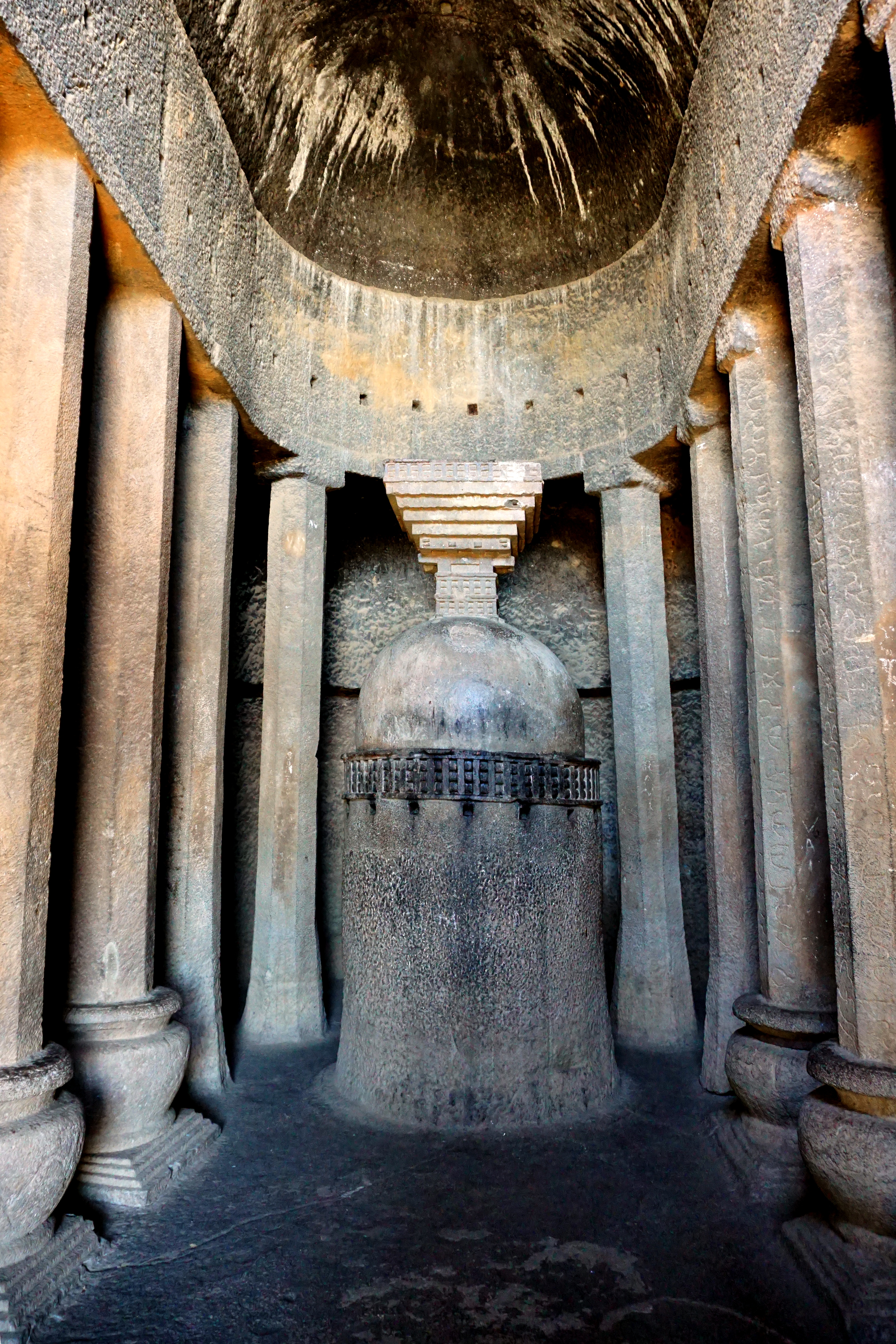
Interior

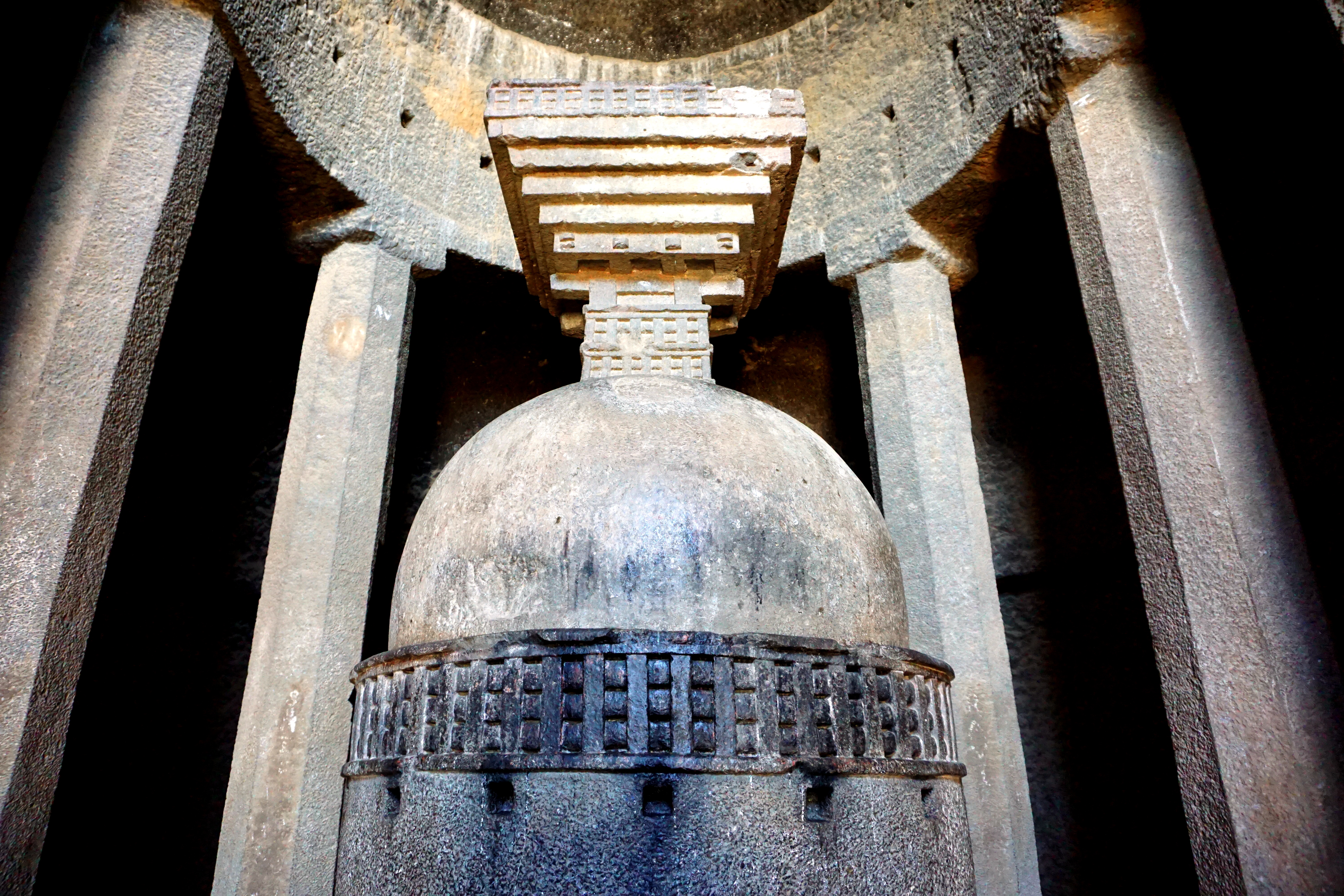
The central stupa.

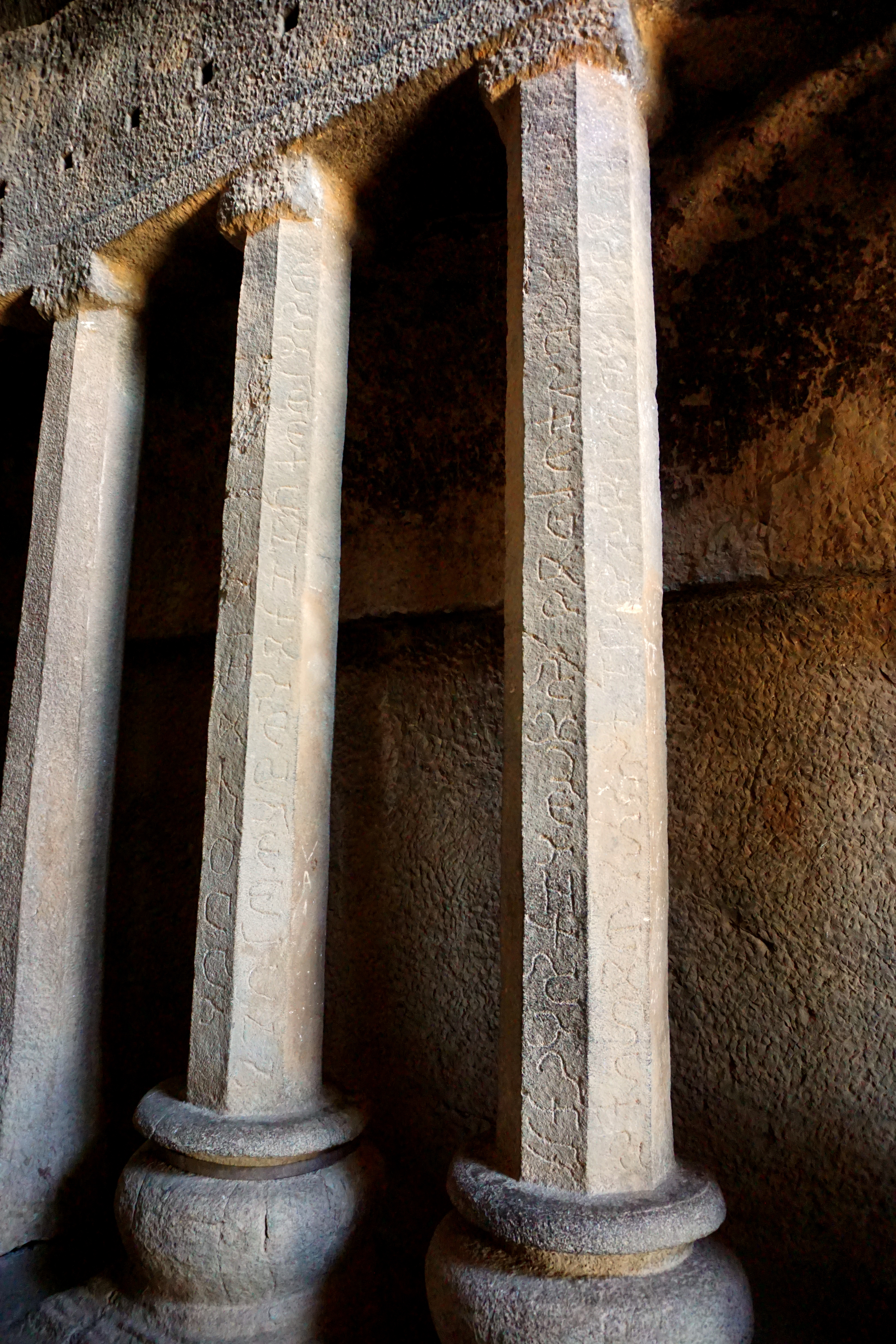
Pillars with inscription No.19
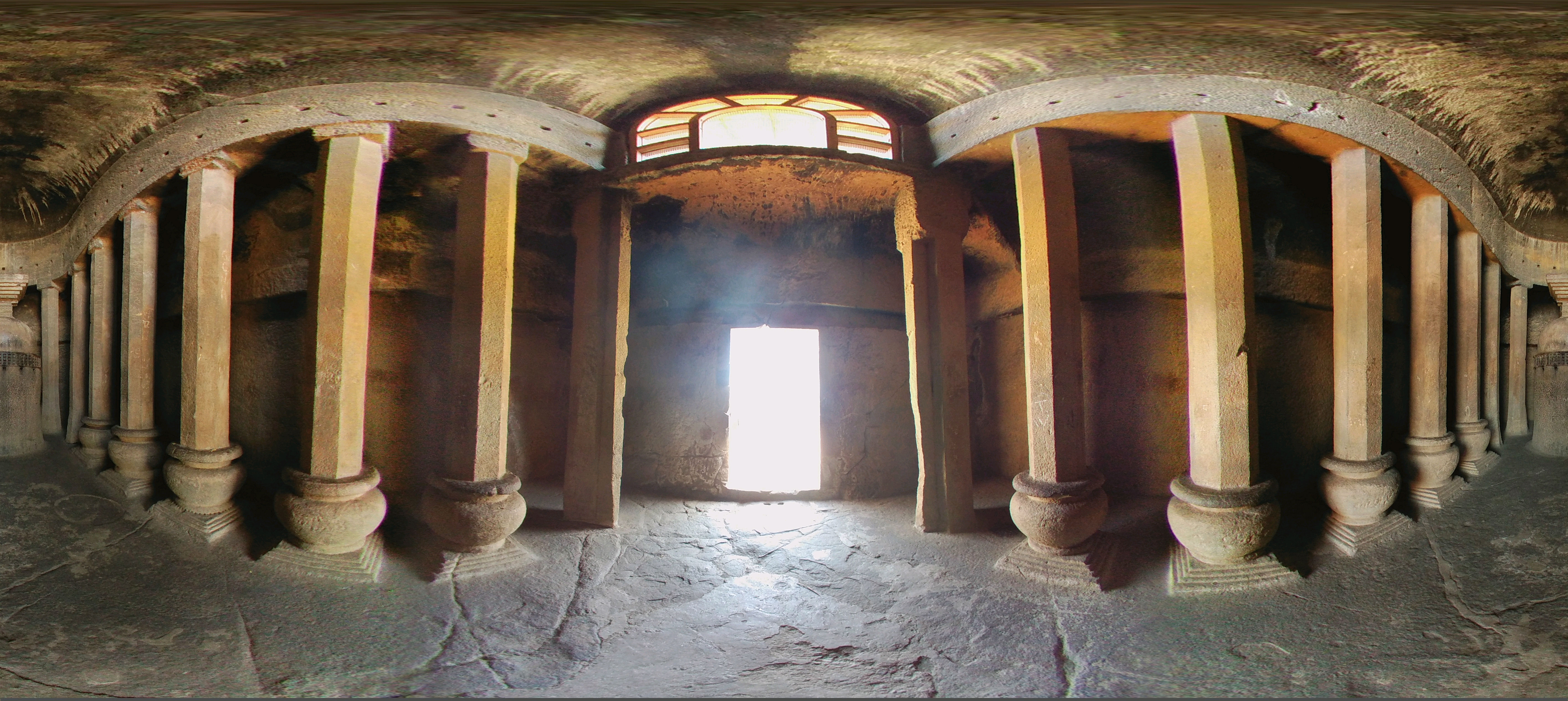
Panorama, looking towards the outside

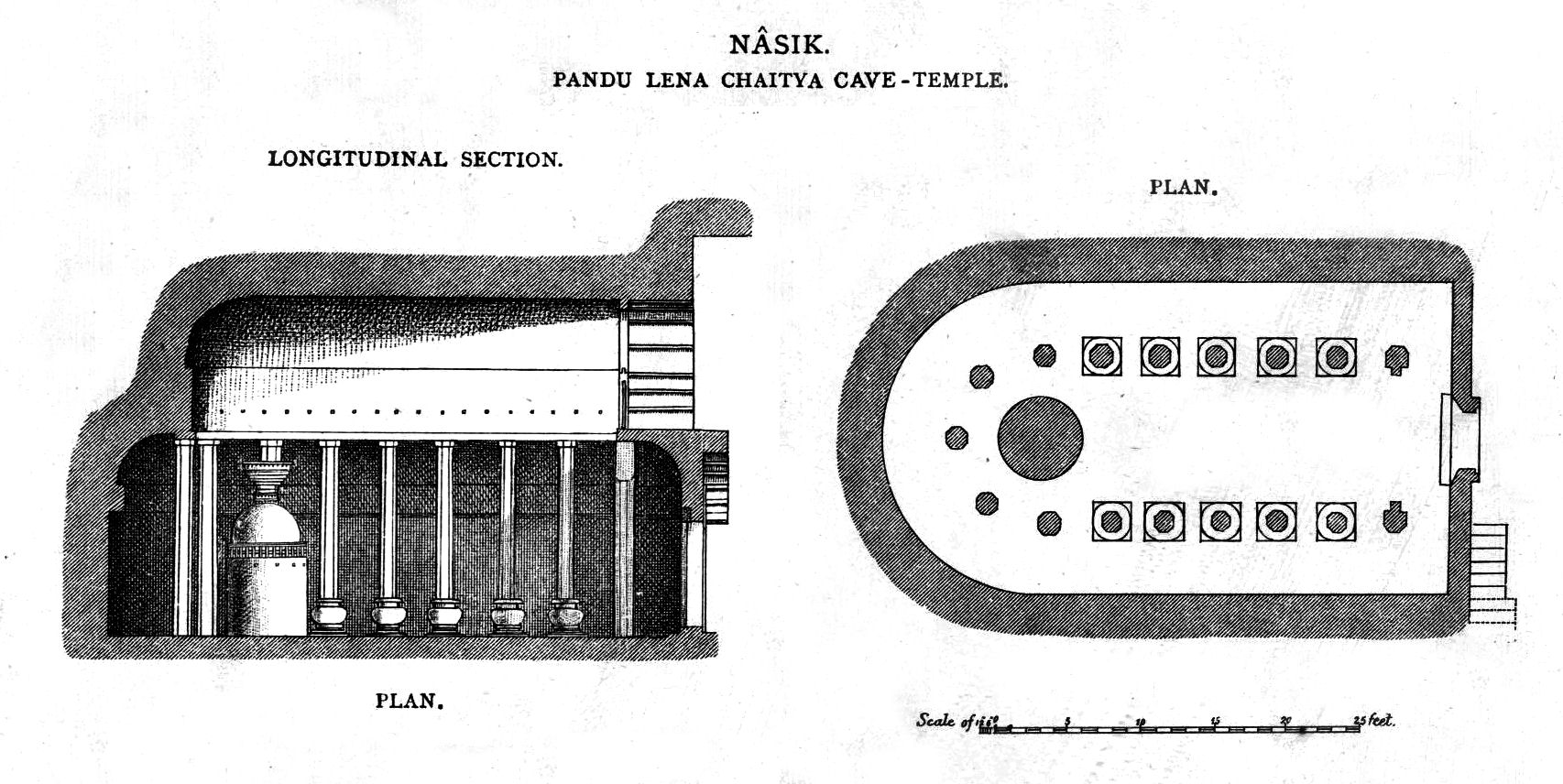
Section and plan

==== Inscriptions ====
The cave has several inscriptions. Inscription No.19 appears on the 5th and 6th pillars on the right aisle of the Chaitya, and explains that the cave received some perfecting by the wife of a government official, but the government in question remains unnamed:

"By Bhatapalika, the grand-daughter of Mahahakusiri and daughter of the royal officer Arahalaya from Chalisilana, wife of the royal officer Agiyatanaka, of the treasure office, mother of Kapananaka, this Chaityagriha has been caused to be perfected on this mount Tiranhu."

— Inscription No.19, Cave No.18

This inscription is slightly less ancient than the inscription on the doorway, suggesting that it was inscribed some time in the later phases of the construction of the cave.

Inscription No.20 explains that the decoration above the doorway was a donation of the people of nearby Nashik ("The gift of the village of Dhambhika, of the Nasik people"). Inscription No.21 records the donation of the rail pattern.

=== Cave No.19 "Krishna vihara" (100-70 BCE) ===
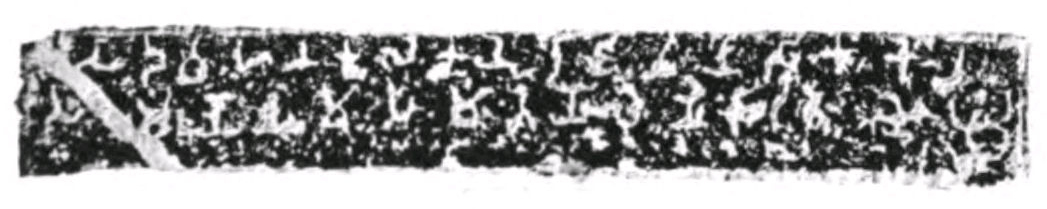
Inscription of king Kanha in cave No.19 (located on the upper sill of the right window). Also called the "Krishna inscription" from the King's name in the Puranas. This is the oldest known Satavahana inscription, circa 100-70 BCE. Brahmi script: 𑀲𑀸𑀤𑀯𑀸𑀳𑀦𑀓𑀼𑀮𑁂 𑀓𑀦𑁆𑀳𑁂 𑀭𑀸𑀚𑀺𑀦𑀺 𑀦𑀸𑀲𑀺𑀓𑁂𑀦 𑀲𑀫𑀡𑁂𑀦 𑀫𑀳𑀸𑀫𑀸𑀢𑁂𑀡 𑀮𑁂𑀡 𑀓𑀸𑀭𑀺𑀢 Sādavāhanakule Kanhe rājini Nāsikakena Samaṇena mahāmāteṇa leṇa kārita "Under King Kanha of the Satavahana family this cave has been caused to be made by the officer in charge of the Sramanas at Nasik".

Cave 19 is at a rather lower level even than the Chaitya cave, and some distance in advance of it, but the front and interior have been so filled up with earth as to conceal it from general view. It is a small Vihara, 14 feet 3 inches square, with six cells, two on each side; their doors are surmounted by the Chaitya-arch ornament connected by a frieze of "rail pattern" in some places wavy. In the front wall are two lattice windows, and in the veranda two slender square pillars, the middle portion of the shaft being chamfered to an octagonal shape.

The cave is exceedingly plain style, and the remarkable rectangularity of all its parts, agree perfectly with what might be expected in a Vihara of the first or second century BCE. Its close family likeness to Cave No.12 at Ajanta and others at Bhaja and Kondane, all of the earliest age, suggest about the same date.

The cave has one inscription of king Krishna of the Satavahanas, which is the oldest known Satavahana inscription, dated to 100-70 BCE:

𑀲𑀸𑀤𑀯𑀸𑀳𑀦𑀓𑀼𑀮𑁂 𑀓𑀦𑁆𑀳𑁂 𑀭𑀸𑀚𑀺𑀦𑀺 𑀦𑀸𑀲𑀺𑀓𑁂𑀦 𑀲𑀫𑀡𑁂𑀦 𑀫𑀳𑀸𑀫𑀸𑀢𑁂𑀡 𑀮𑁂𑀡 𑀓𑀸𑀭𑀺𑀢

Sādavāhanakule Kanhe rājini Nāsikakena Samaṇena mahāmāteṇa leṇa kārita
"Under King Kanha of the Satavahana family, this cave has been caused to be made by the officer in charge of the Sramanas at Nasik."

— Inscription of Cave No.19

Cave No.19, "Krishna vihara", circa 100-70 BCE
Cave No19 is located on the ground floor, to the left of the entrance of Cave No.18, and right under cave No.20. Cave No.19 has one inscription mentioning the dedication by a government officer during the rule of king Krishna of the Satavahanas. King Krishna, also called Kanha, is said to have ruled in the 1st century BCE (100-70 BCE), which makes Cave No.19 one of the earliest to be excavated.
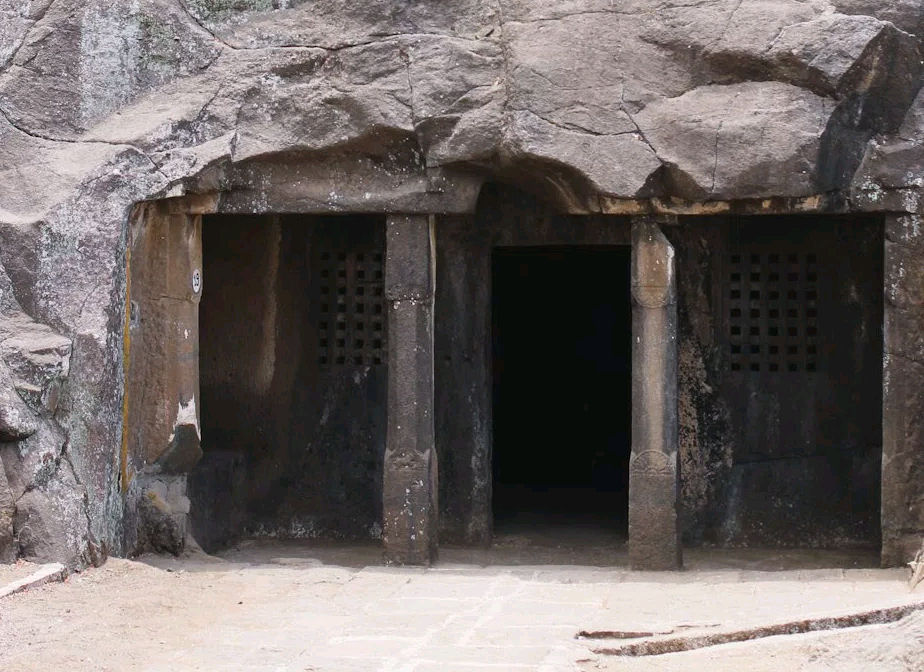
Cave No.19

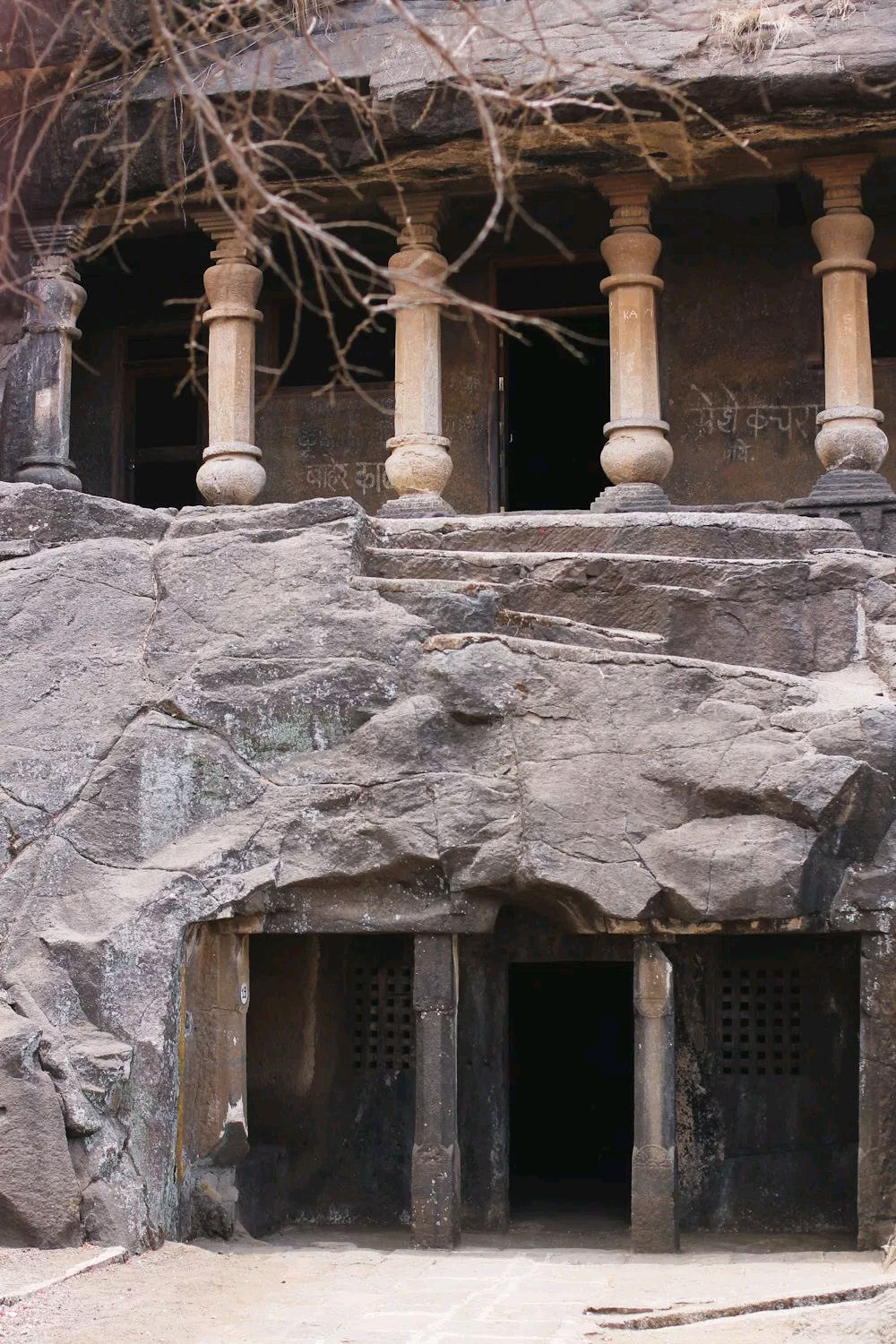
Cave No.19 is located right under Cave No.20

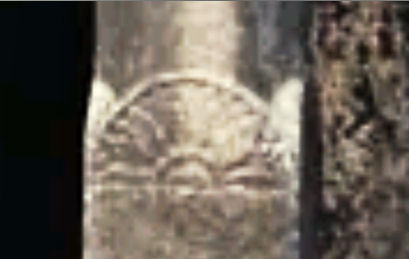
A halk-flower medallions design on a pillar of Cave No.19, typical of early designs such as those of Sanchi.

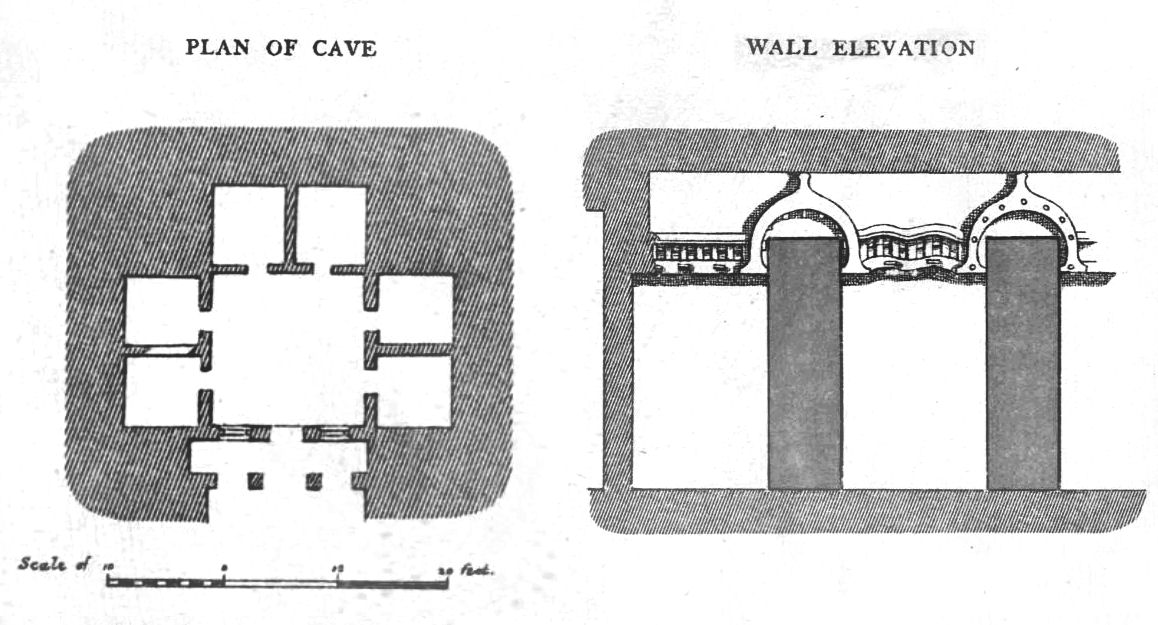
Plan and inside elevation of cave No.19, "Krishna vihara" (100-70 BCE).

=== Cave No.20: "Sri Yajna vihara" (circa 180 CE) ===
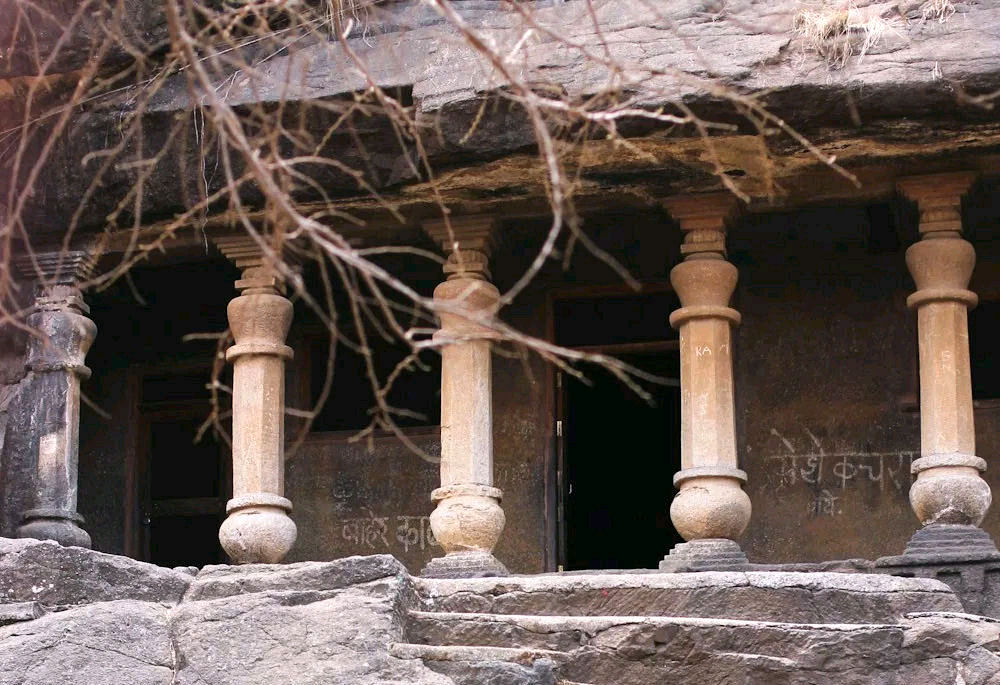
Exterior. 3D tour.

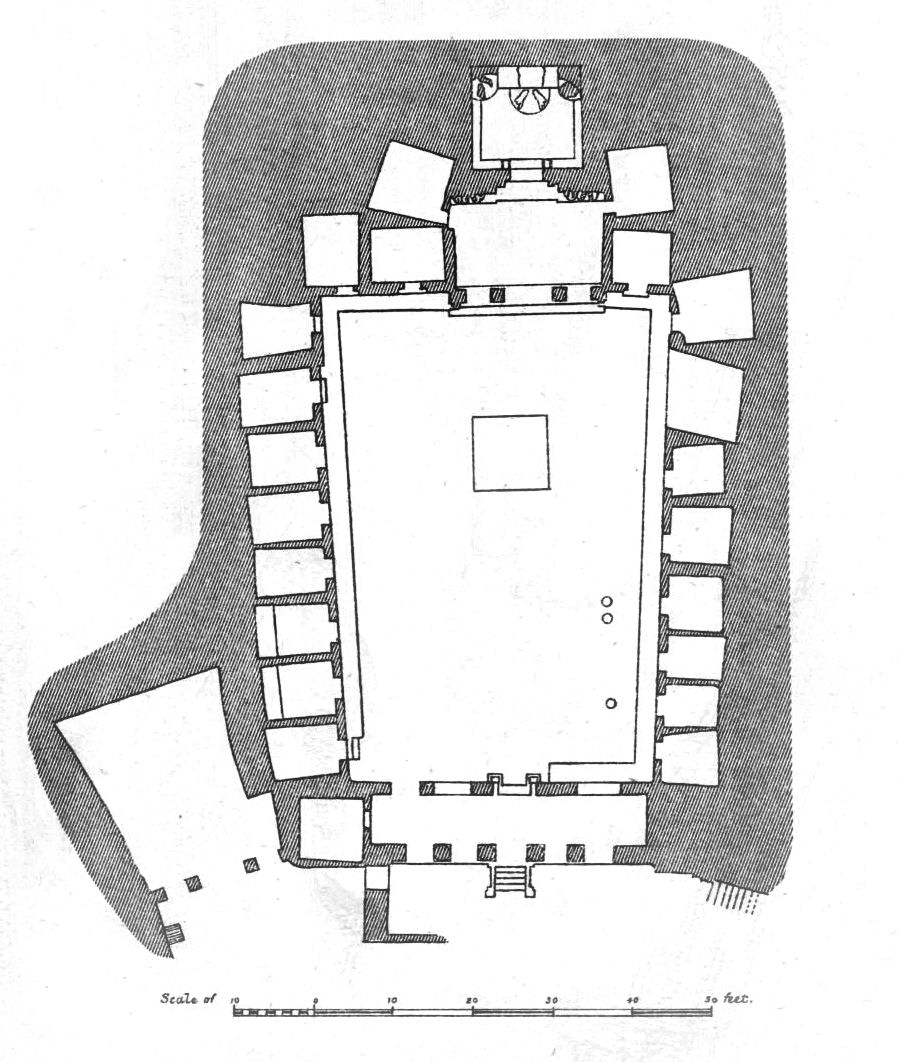
Cave 20 plan.

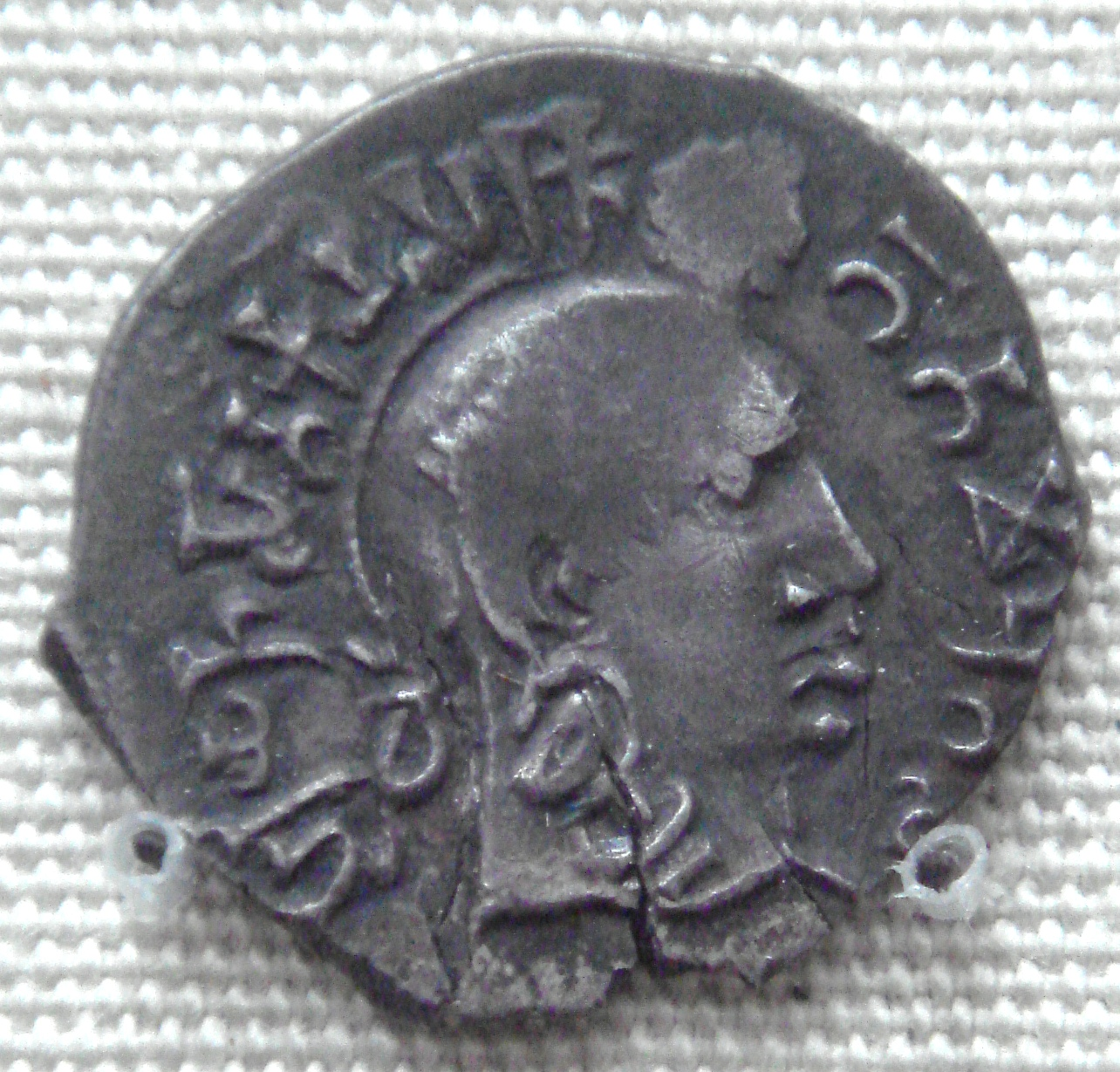
Coin of Yajna Sri Satakarni (170-199 CE), in the 7th year of the reign of which the cave was completed. British Museum.

Cave No.20 is another large Vihara, its hall varying in width from 37.5 feet at the front to 44 feet at the back and 61.5 feet deep. Originally it was little over 40 feet deep, but at a much later date it was altered and extended back by one "Marma, a worshipper," as recorded on the wall. It has eight cells on each side, one on the right rather a recess than a cell, two on the left with stone beds, while in the back are two cells to the left of the antechamber and one to the right, with one more on each side of the antechamber and entered from it.

The hall is surrounded by a low bench as in Cave 3, and in the middle of the floor is a low platform, about 9 feet square, apparently intended for an asana or seat; but whether to place an image upon for worship, or as a "seat of the law", where the Thera or high priest might sit when teaching and discussing, is impossible to say. On the right-hand side, and nearer the front, are three small circular elevations in the floor much like ordinary millstones. They may be seats also for members of the clergy, or bases on which to set small moveable dagobas. But when the cave was altered and extended backward, the floor seems also to have been lowered a few inches to form the low dais and these bases.

The antechamber is slightly raised above the level of the hall, from which it is divided by two richly carved columns between antae. On either side the shrine door is a gigantic dvarapala, 9.5 feet high, with an attendant female, but so besmeared with soot for the cave has been long occupied by Bhairagis, that minor details are scarcely recognisable. These dvarapalas, however, hold lotus stalks, have the same elaborate head-dresses, with a small dagoba in the front of one, and a figure of Buddha in the other, and have the same attendants and vidyaharas flying over head as we find in the later Buddhist caves at Aurangabad.

In the shrine, too, is the colossal image of Buddha, 10 feet high, seated with his feet on a lotus flower and holding the little finger of his left hand between the thumb and forefinger of his right. He is attended by two gigantic chauri-bearer with the same distinguishing features as the dvarapala. All this points to about the 7th century CE or later, as the age of alteration of this cave.

Fortunately there is an inscription of the 7th year of Yajna Sri Satakarni (170-199 CE), stating that "after having been under excavation for many years " it was then carried to completion by the wife of the commander-in-chief. It is quite clear, however, that the inner and outer parts were excavated at widely different ages. This inscriptions shows, as the inscriptions of Yajna Sri Satakarni in Kanheri caves, that the Satavahanas had reclaimed the area of Kanheri and Nasik from the Western Satraps during the reign of Sri Yajna Satakarni.

The pillars of the veranda have the water-pot bases, and the bell-shaped capitals of those in Karle Chaitya. Those of the sanctuary are represented, and belong to a widely distant age. Like No.17, it has a side door near the left end of the veranda, and a cell in that end.

The façade has four octagonal pillars between antae, the shafts more slender than in any of the other caves, but the bases of the same pattern disproportionately large, as if the shafts had been reduced in thickness at a later date. They stand on a paneled base, with five low steps up to it between the middle pair. A low screen wall in front is nearly quite destroyed, except at the east end, where a passage led to a large irregular and apparently unfinished apartment with two plain octagonal pillars with square bases between pilasters in front, and having a water-cistern at the entrance.

Cave No.20 "Sri Yajna vihara" (circa 180 CE)

Cave No.20 has one large inscription, claiming that the unfinished cave was completed by the wife of a great general named Bhavagopa, during the 7th year of the rule of king Sri Yajna Satakarni, son of Gotami, after having been started by the ascetic Bopaki. There are similar inscriptions of Sri Yajna Satakarni in cave 3 and cave 81 at Kanheri. This means probably that the cave was carved during the beginning of the end of the 2nd century CE. It also shows that the Satavahanas reclaimed the area of Nasik under Sri Yajna Satakarni.
One more inscription over one of the small cellars mentions its gift by a lay devotee named Mamma.

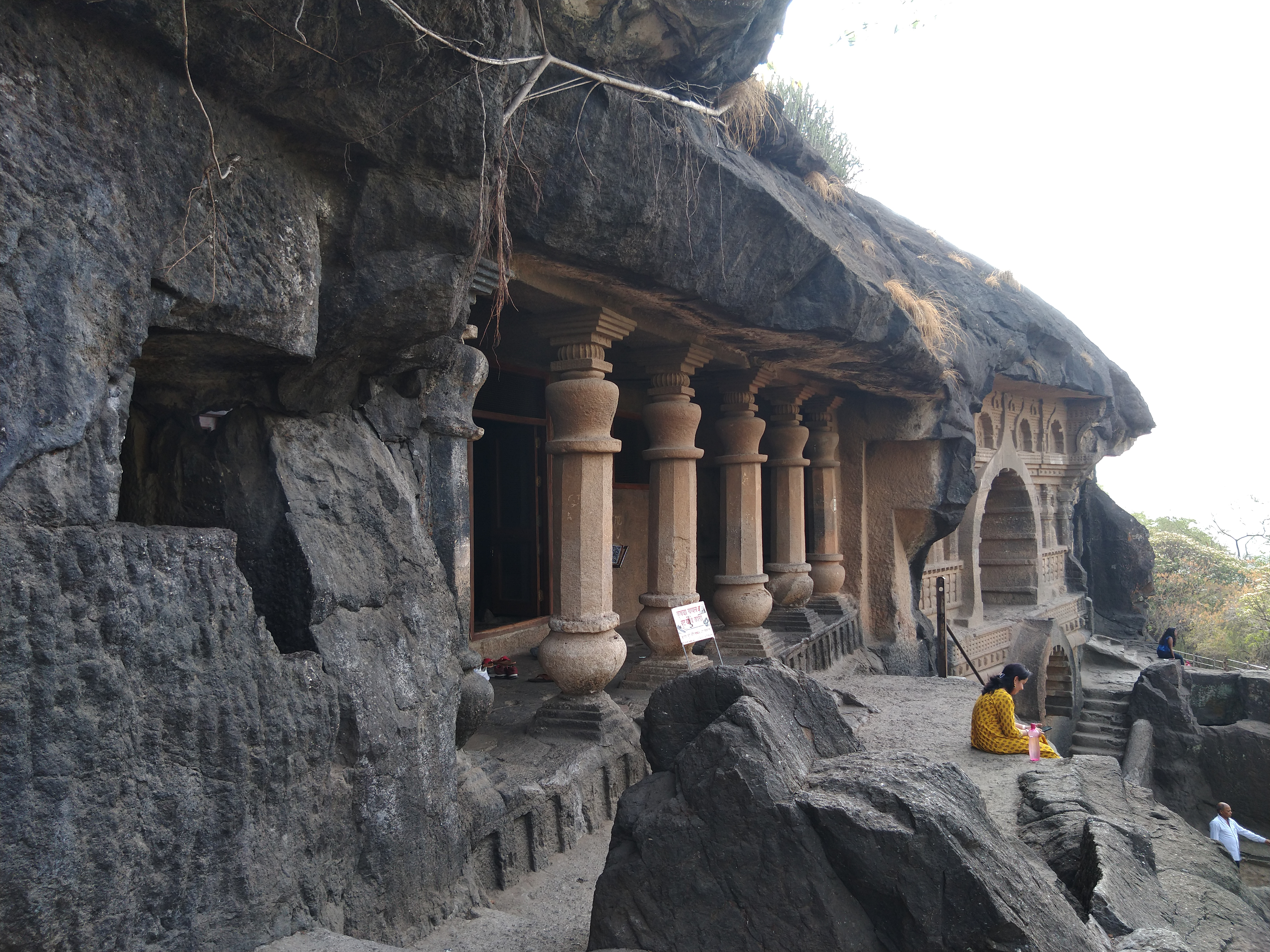
Exterior

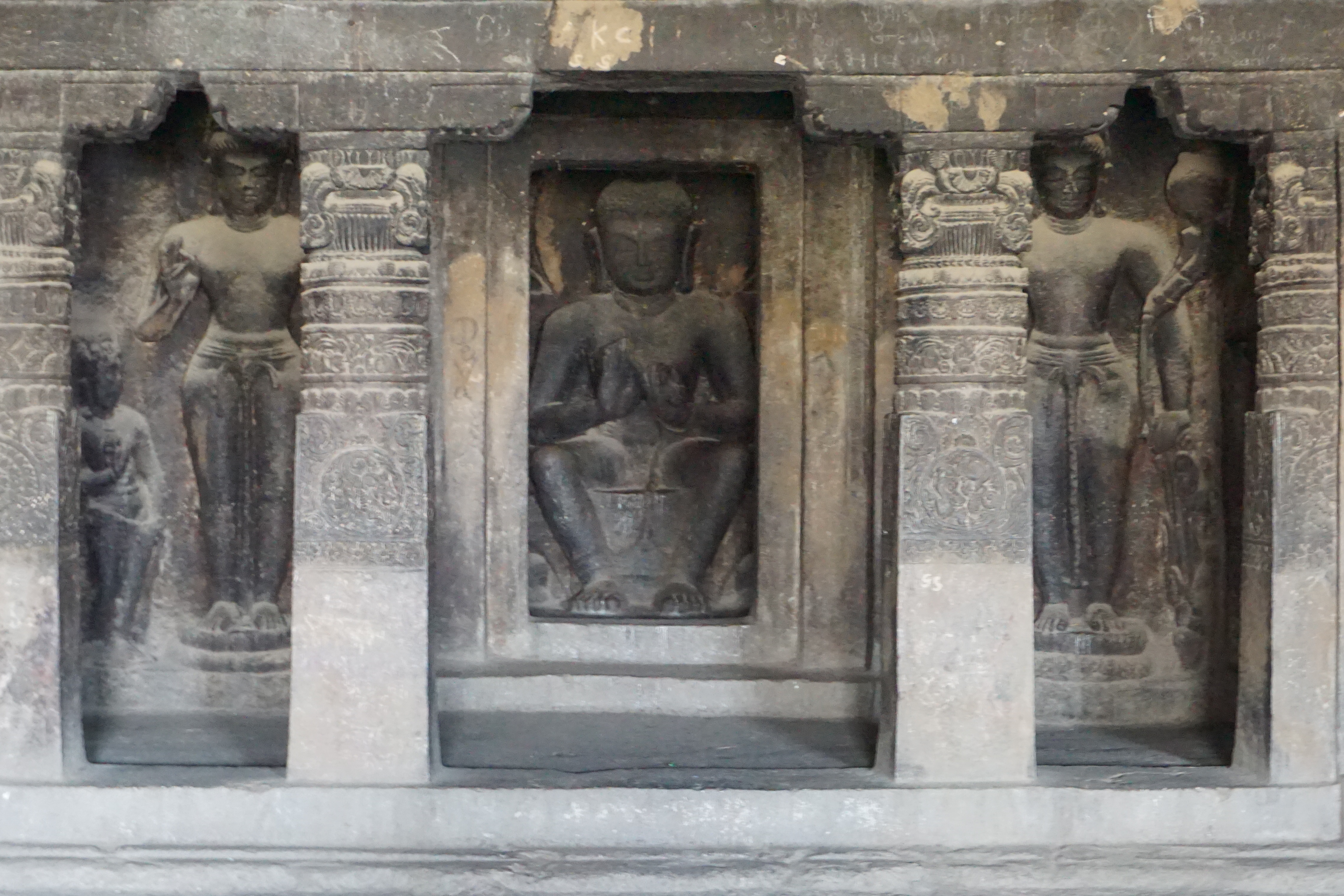
Interior reliefs with Buddha and Bodhisattvas

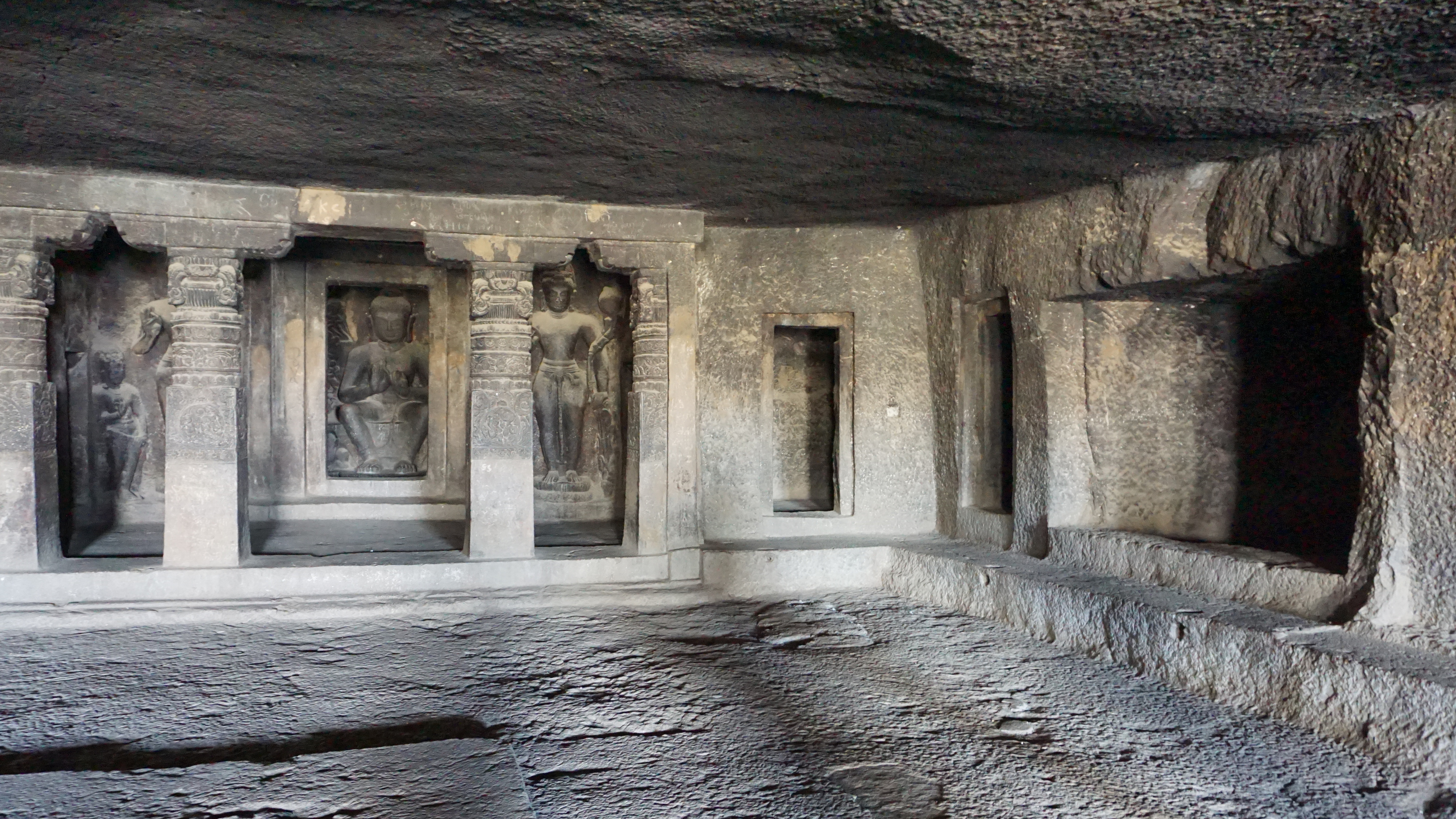
Interior

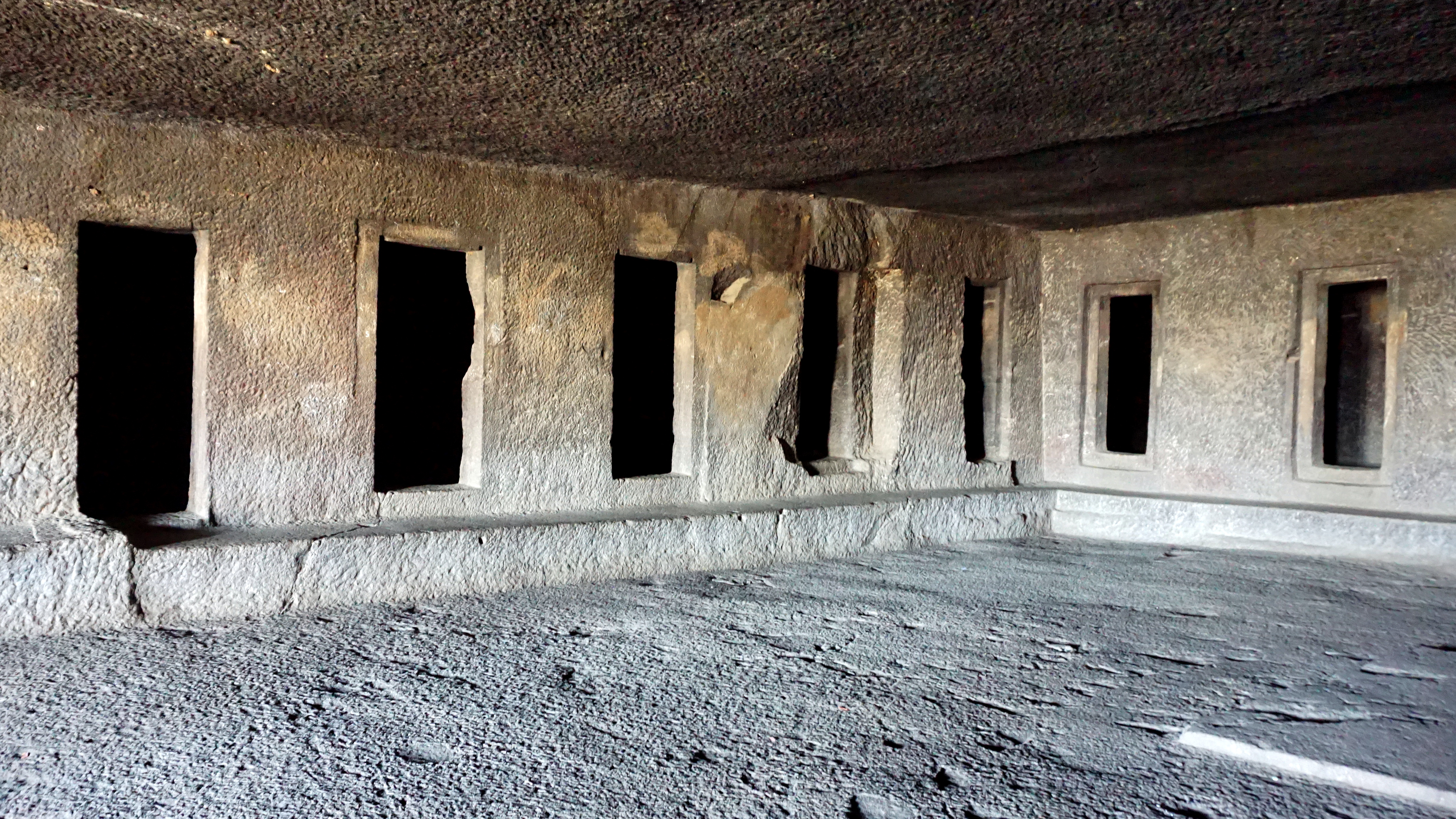
Interior cells

=== Caves No.21-24 ===
Caves No.21 and No. 22
These two small caves do not have inscriptions
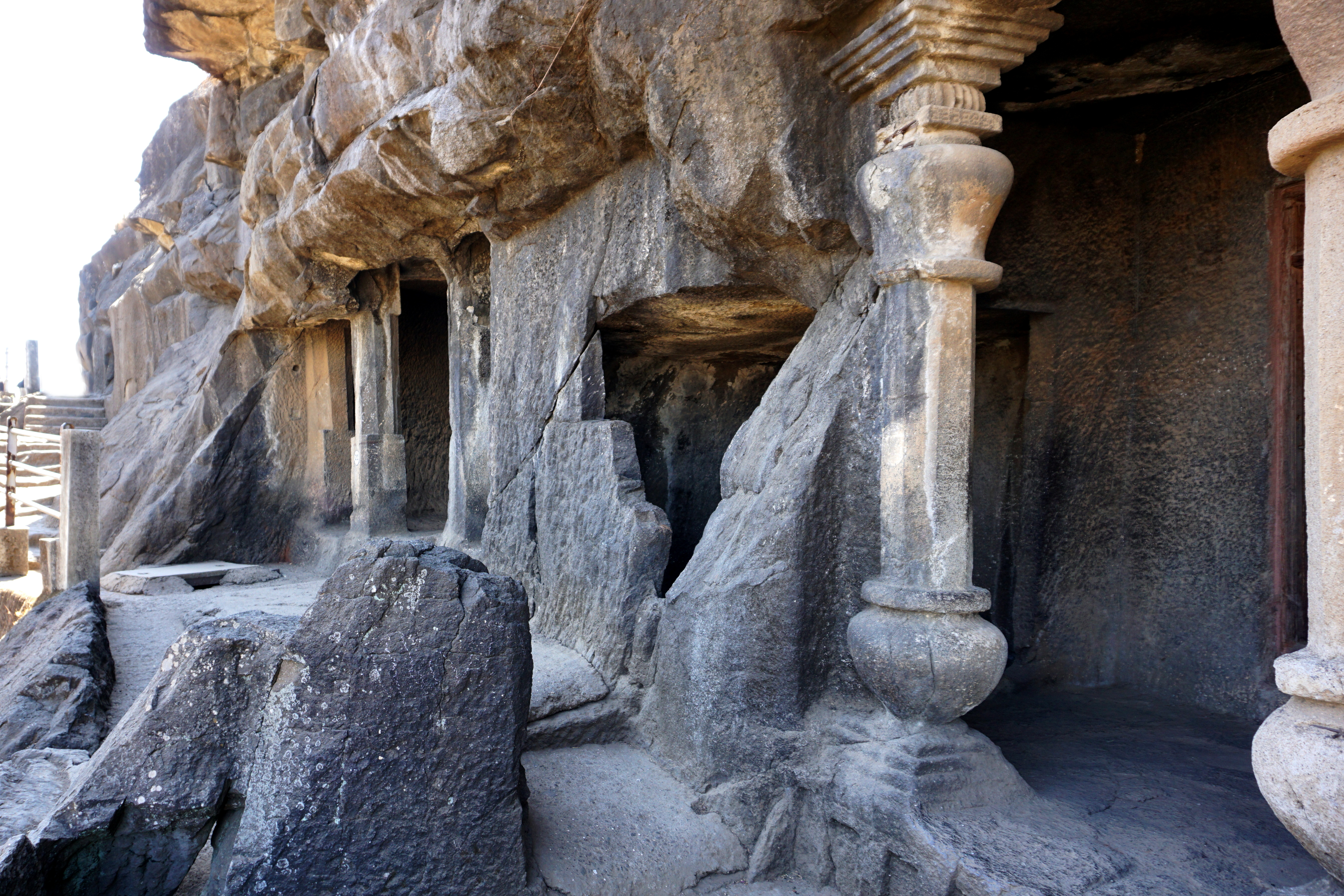
Exterior of caves No.21 and 22 (with pillars of Cave N.20 in the forefront).

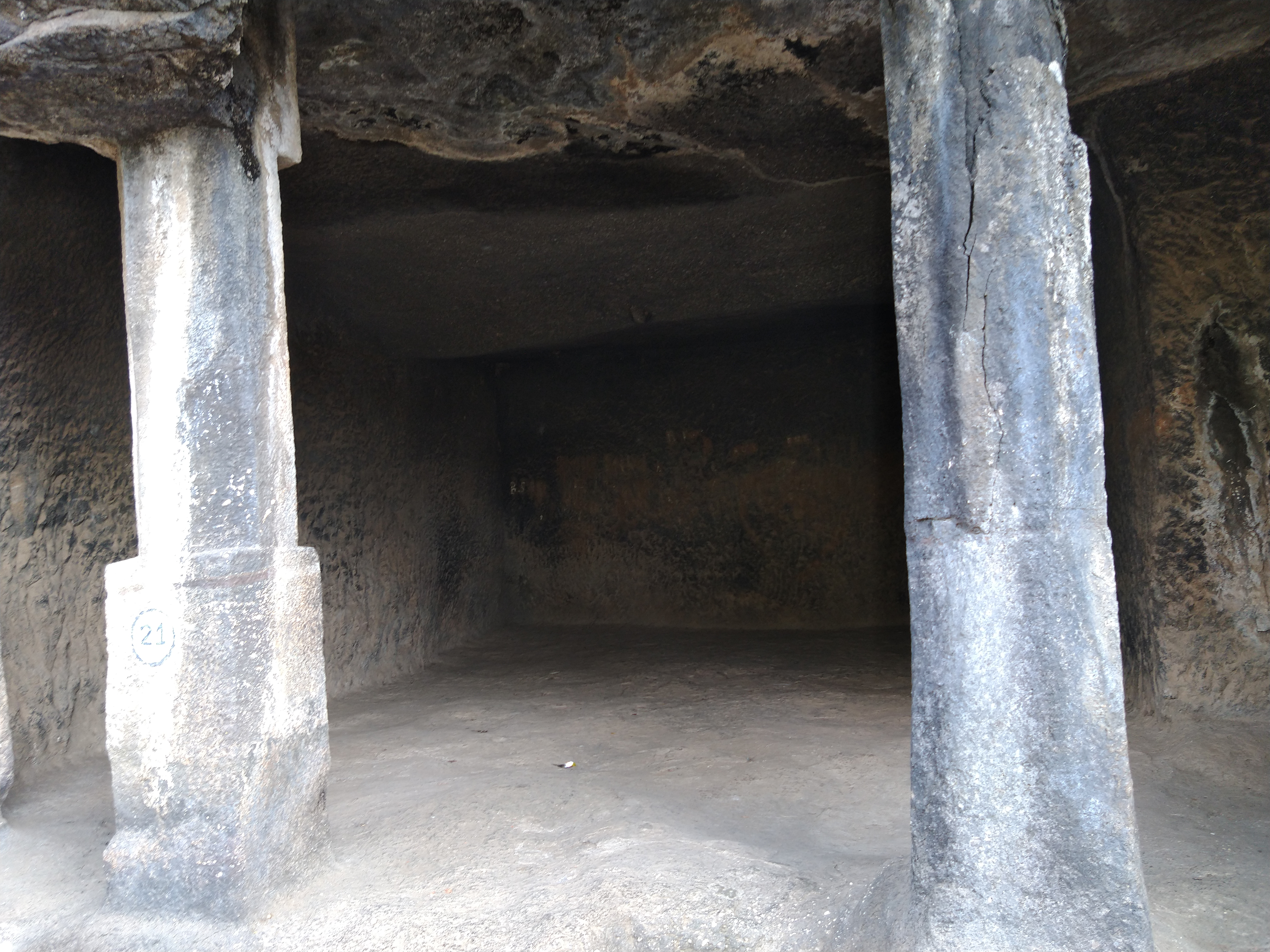
Cave No. 21

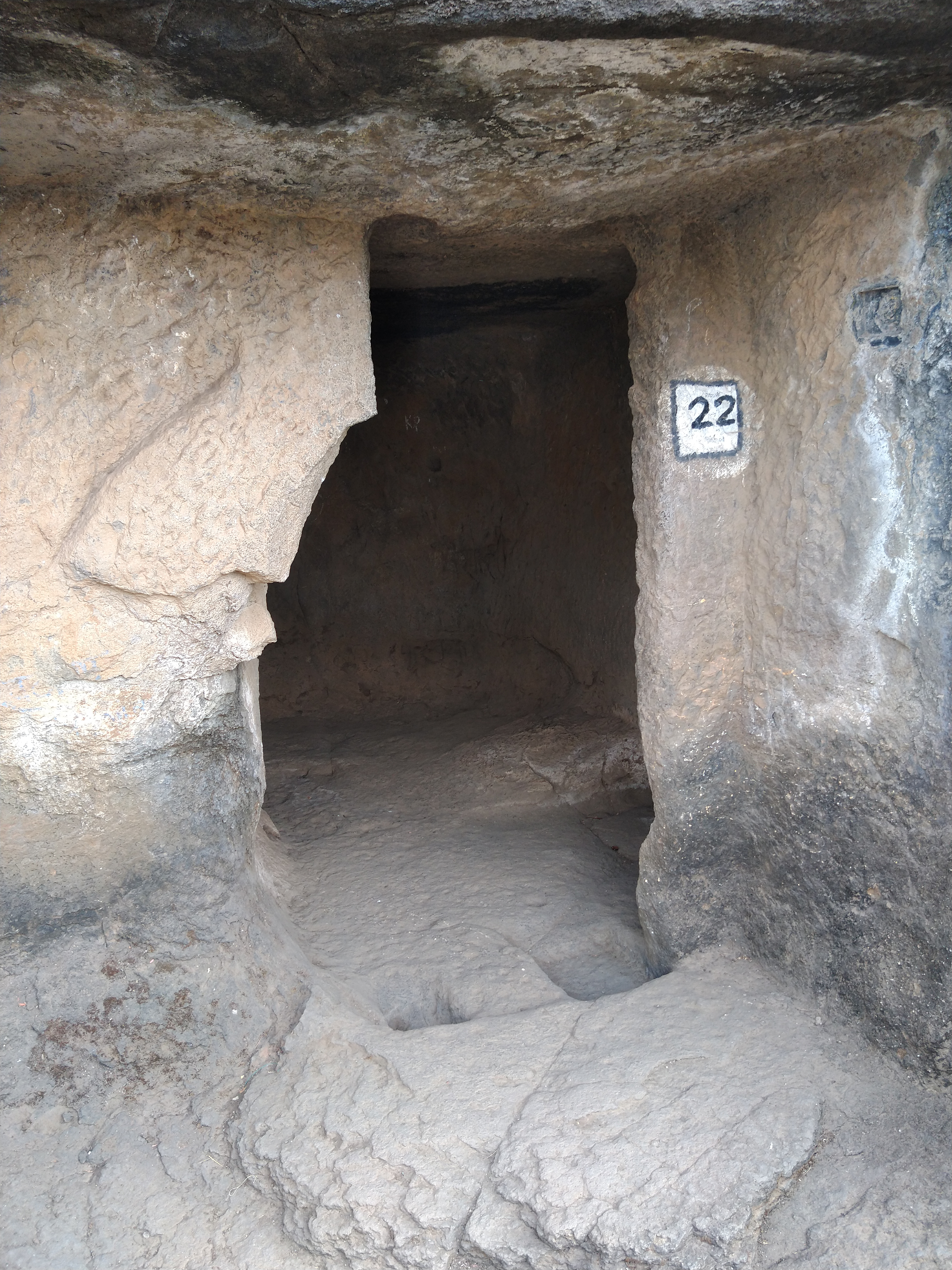
Entrance of Cave No. 22

Cave No.23
Cave No.23 is a large, nondescript, irregular cave, about 30 feet deep, with three shrines. To judge from the holes in the floor and roof it might be supposed that the front and partitions in it had been of wood; the whole façade, however, is destroyed. In front are several cisterns; on the floor is a raised stone bench and a circular base as if for a small structural dagoba; and all the shrines as well as many compartments on the walls are filled with sculptures of the Buddha attended by Padmapani and Vajrapani such as has only been seen in the two shrines high up on the scarp at Caves No.14 and 15, but so like what is found at Aurangabad, Ellora, and Ajanta, that there can be no hesitation in ascribing it to a late age.

Among the many repetitions of Buddha and attendants is a small figure on the wall that cuts off the third shrine from the larger portion of the cave, of Buddha reclining on his right side as represented entering nirvana, much as he is found in Sri Lanka temples, and of which larger representations are found at Ajanta, Kholvi, and Aurangabad. All these, and the female figures of Tara, Lochana, and Mamukhi found in the shrines, clearly show that this was a Mahayana temple. The pillars in front of the entrance to the first shrine are also of a much more modern type than in any of the other caves in Nasik.

Cave No.23 has one inscription recording the building of the cave in year 2 of the reign of Sri Pulumavi.

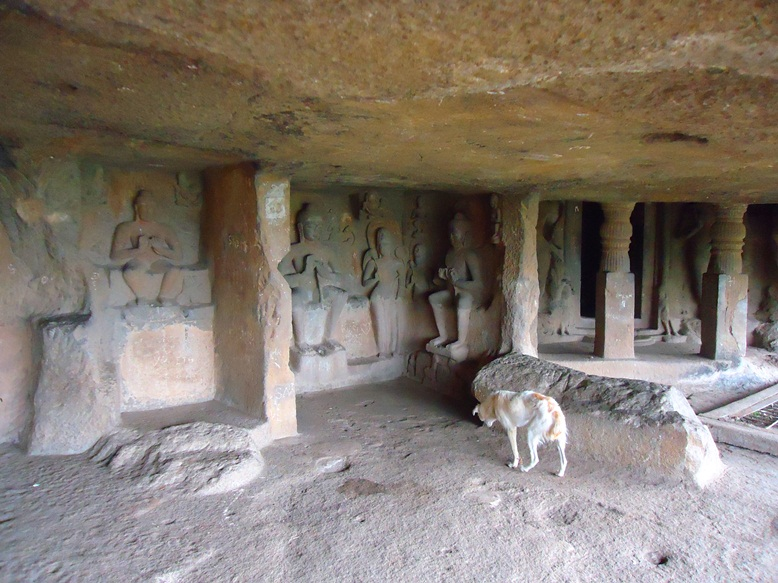
Interior

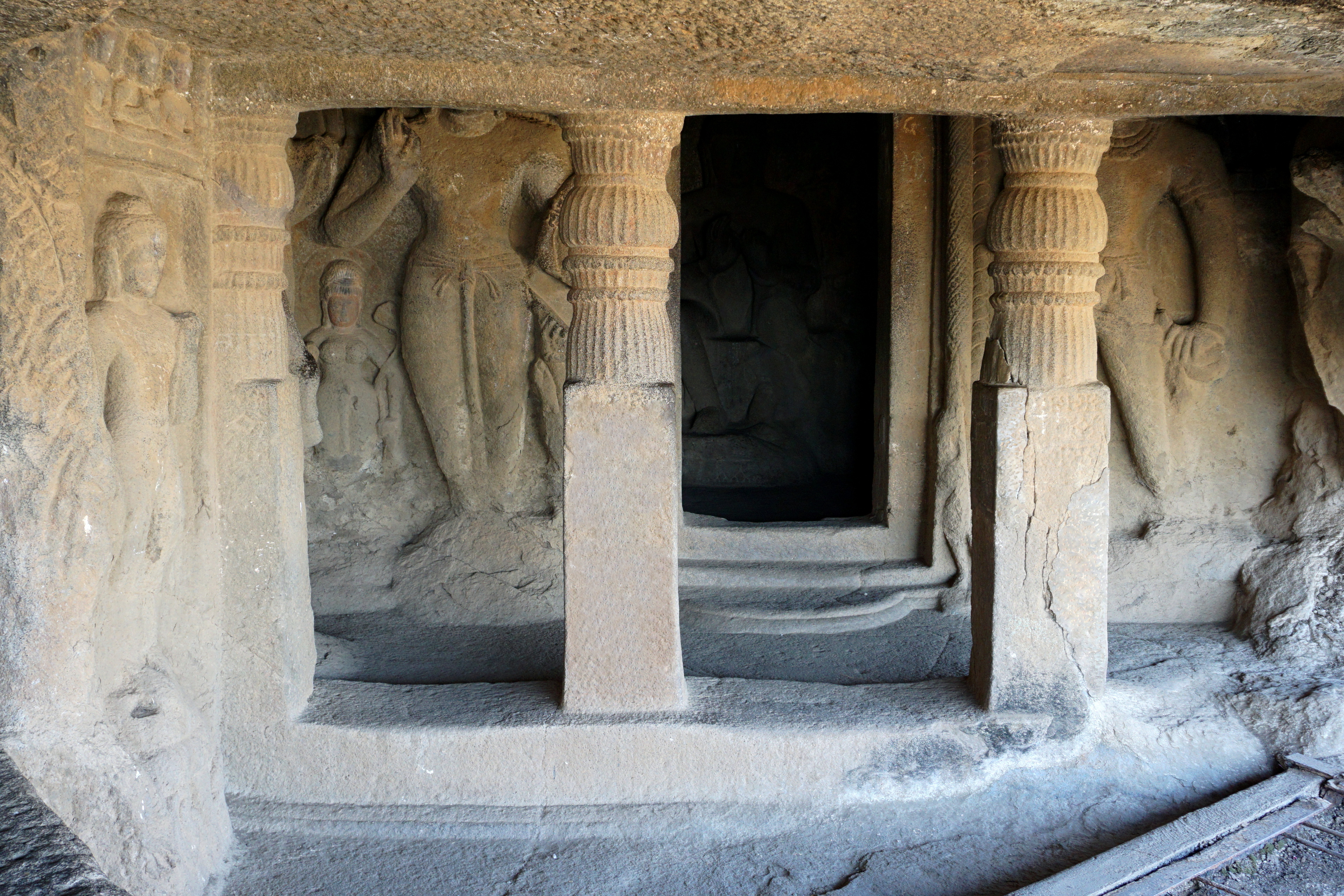
Pillars and Bodhisattvas

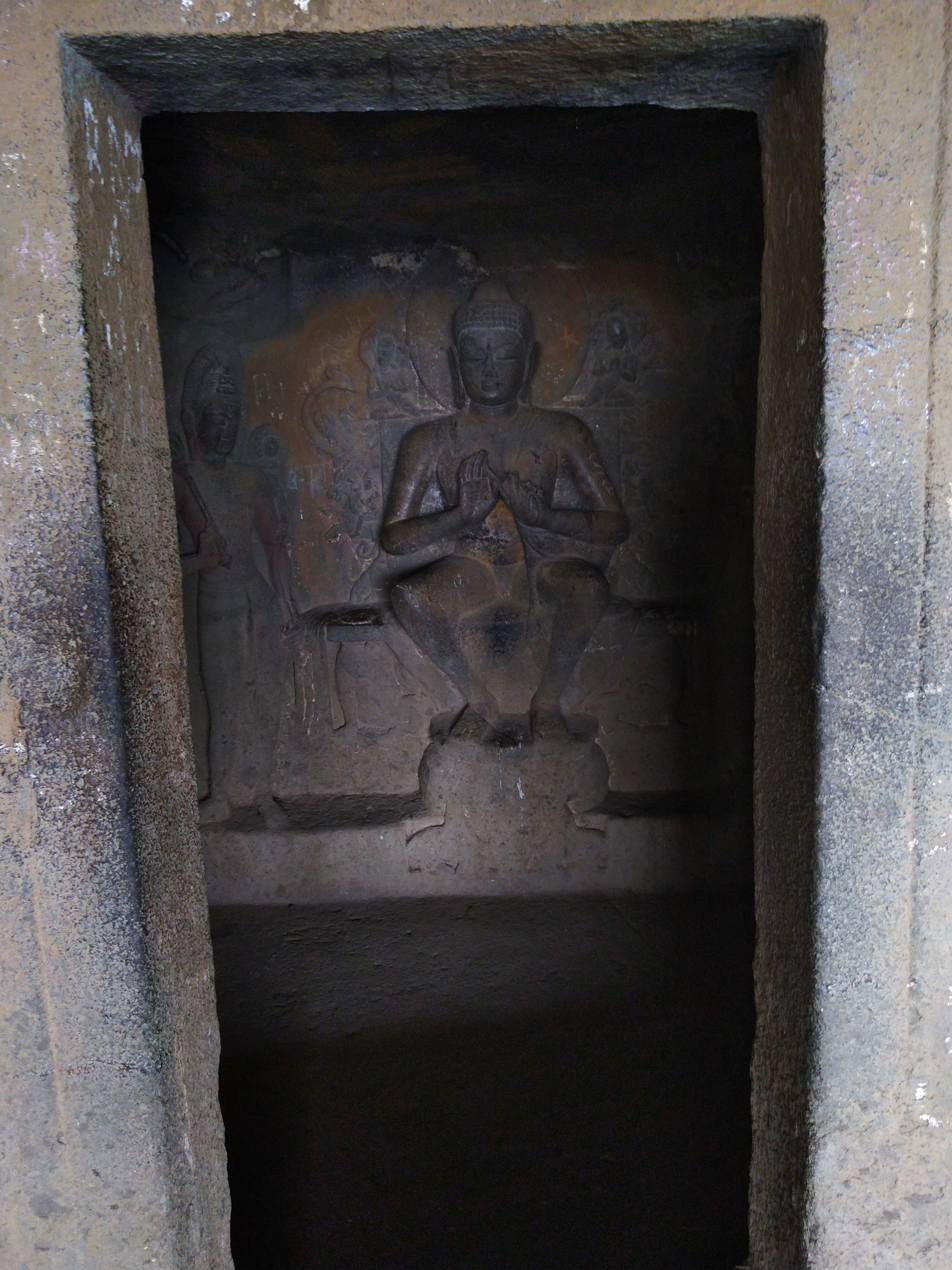
Buddha inside shrine

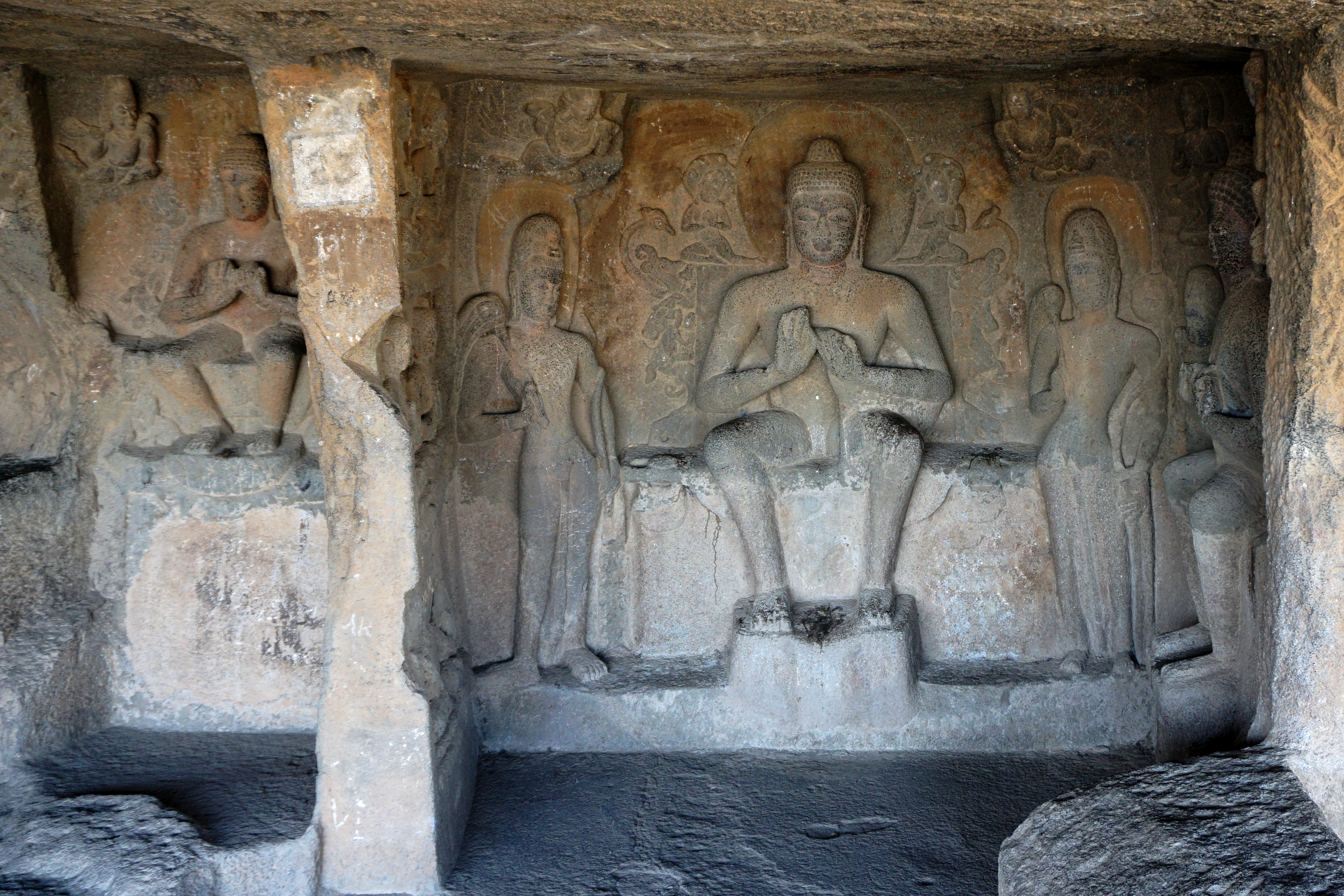
Buddhas and Bodhisattvas

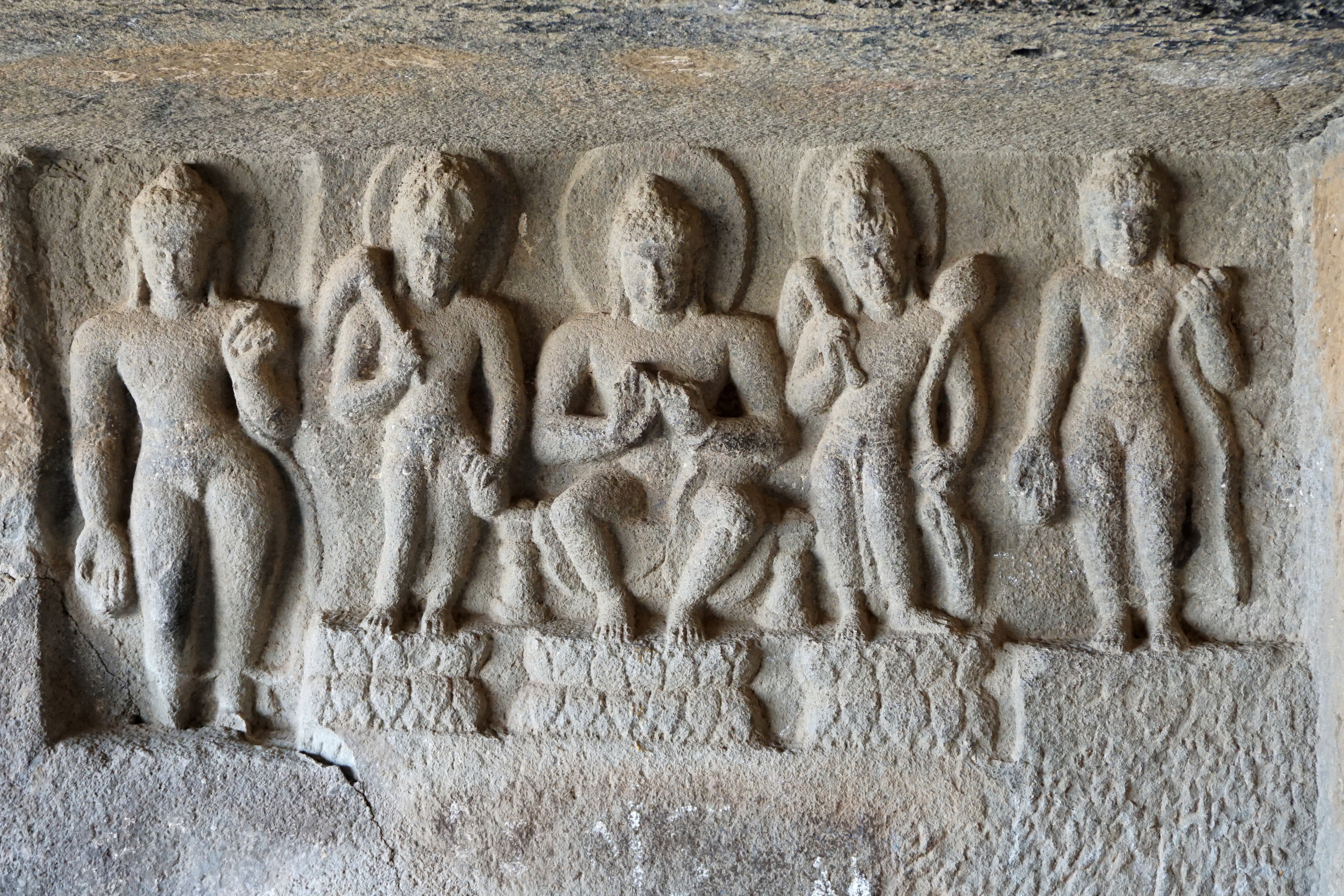
Interior reliefs

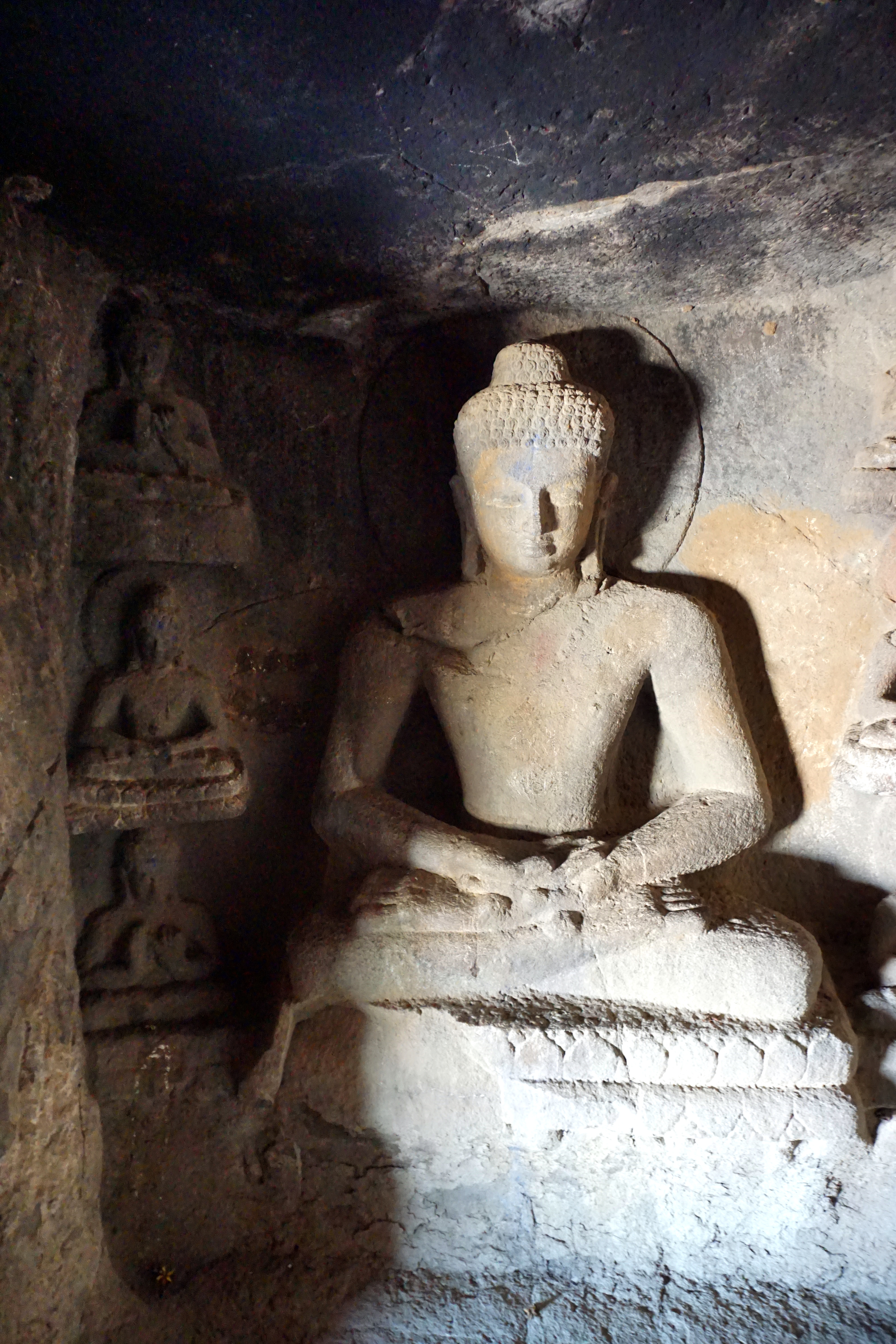
Meditating Buddha

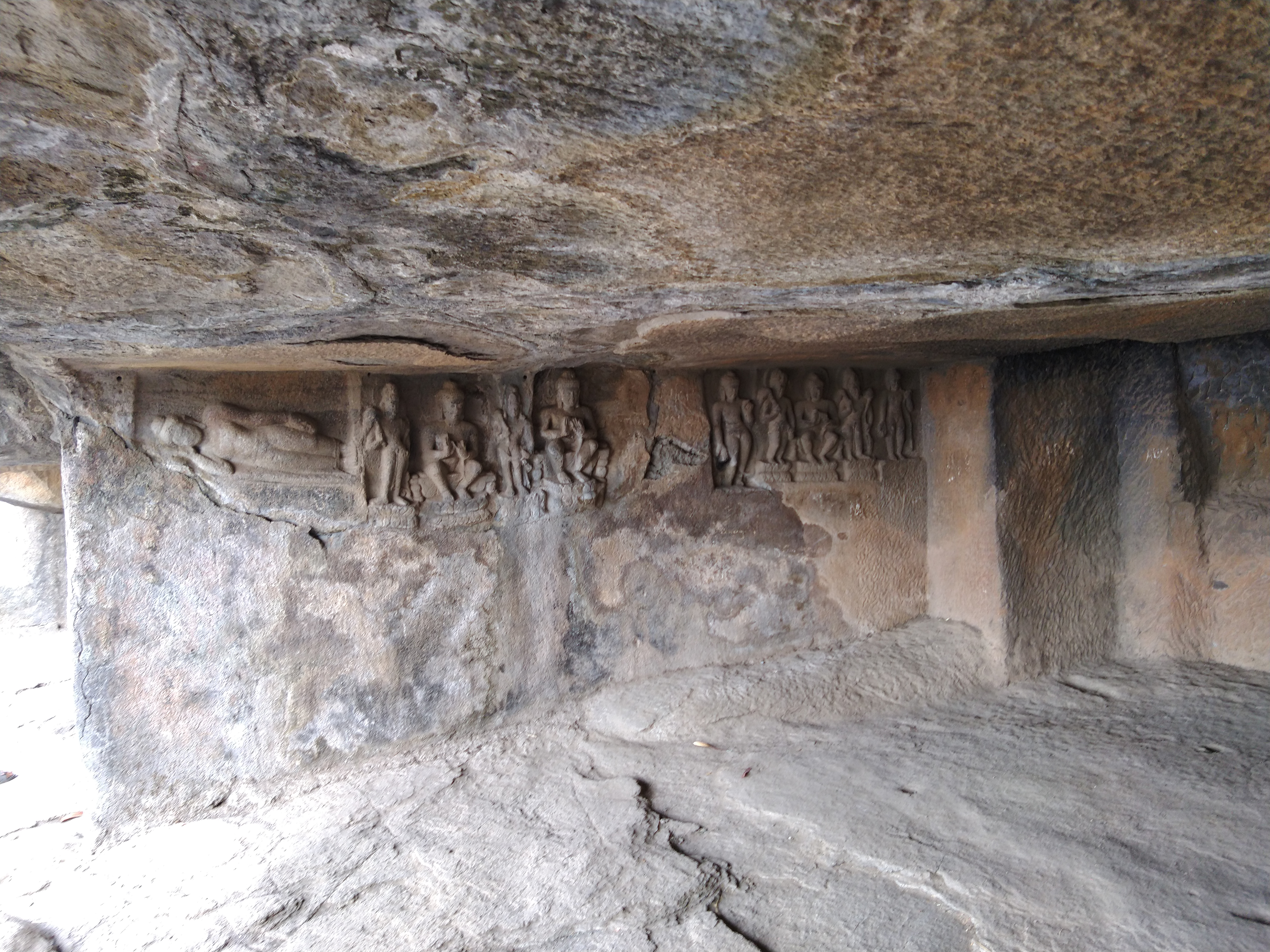
Reclining Buddha and other reliefs

Cave No.24
Cave No.24 is a small Bhikshu's house, the lower part of which has all been quarried away. It probably consisted of a veranda with two small chambers at the back. The frieze is still pretty entire, and whilst preserving the copies of wooden forms, it is ornamented with a string of animal figures as in that of Cave 1; the ends of the projecting beams represented as bearing it, are carved with conventionalized forms of the Buddhist trisula or symbol of dharma, the prongs in one case being changed into cats or some similar animals; seated on the lower beam under the rock at the west end is carved an owl, and at each end of the ornamented "rail pattern" is a rider on a sort of female centaur.

Cave No.24 has one inscription recording the gift of the cave by a writer named Vudhika.

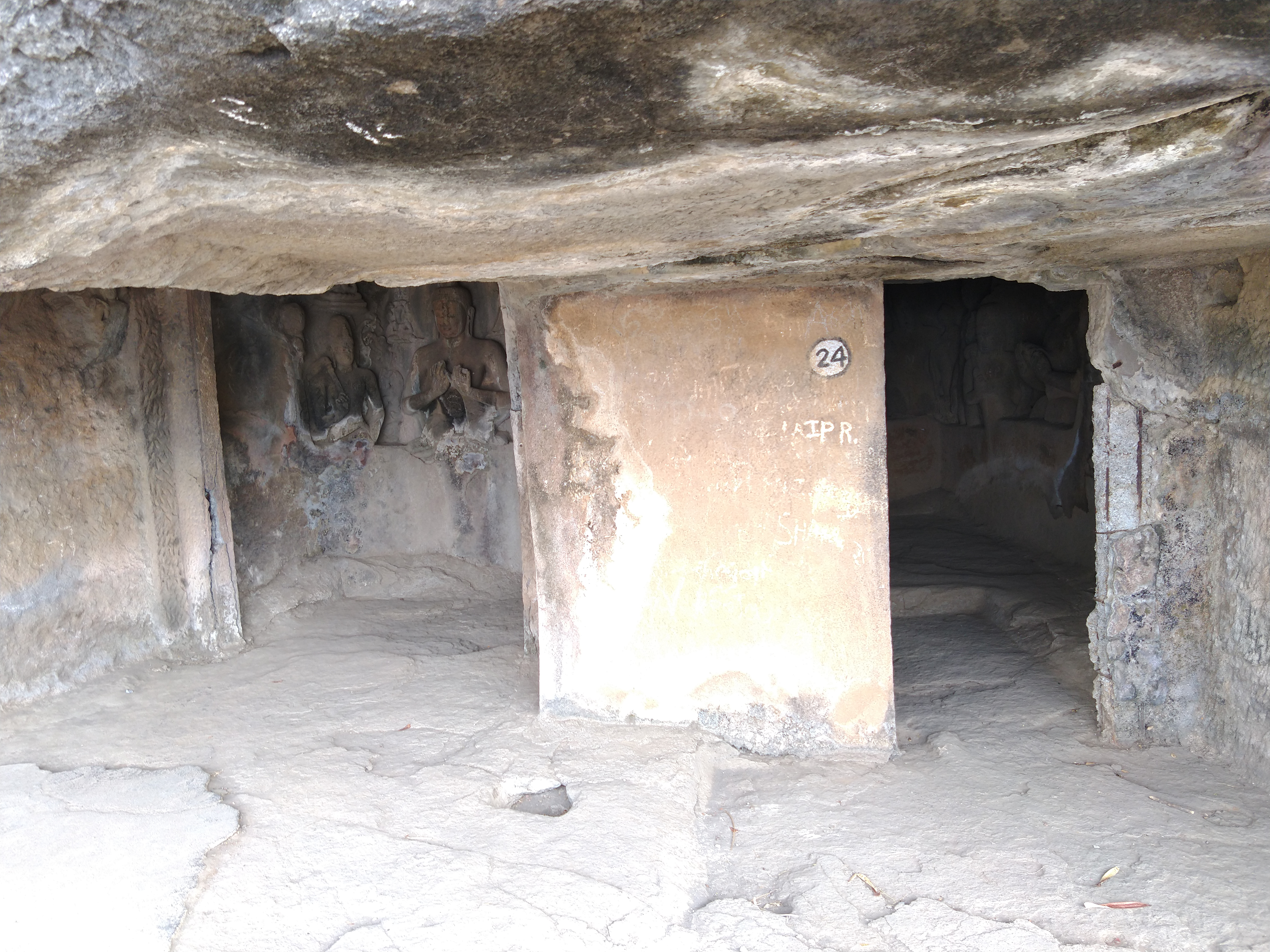
Exterior

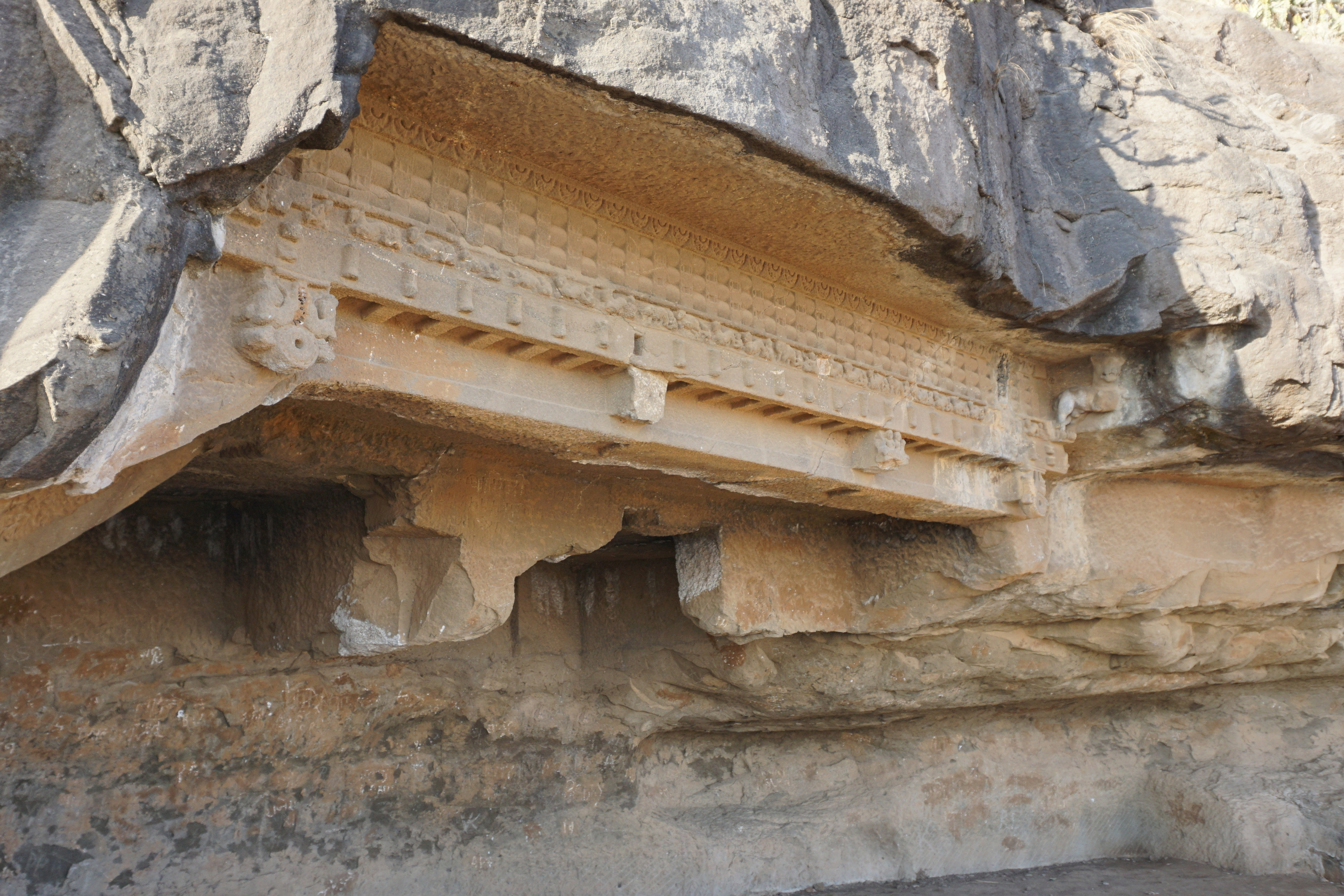
Sculpted ledge

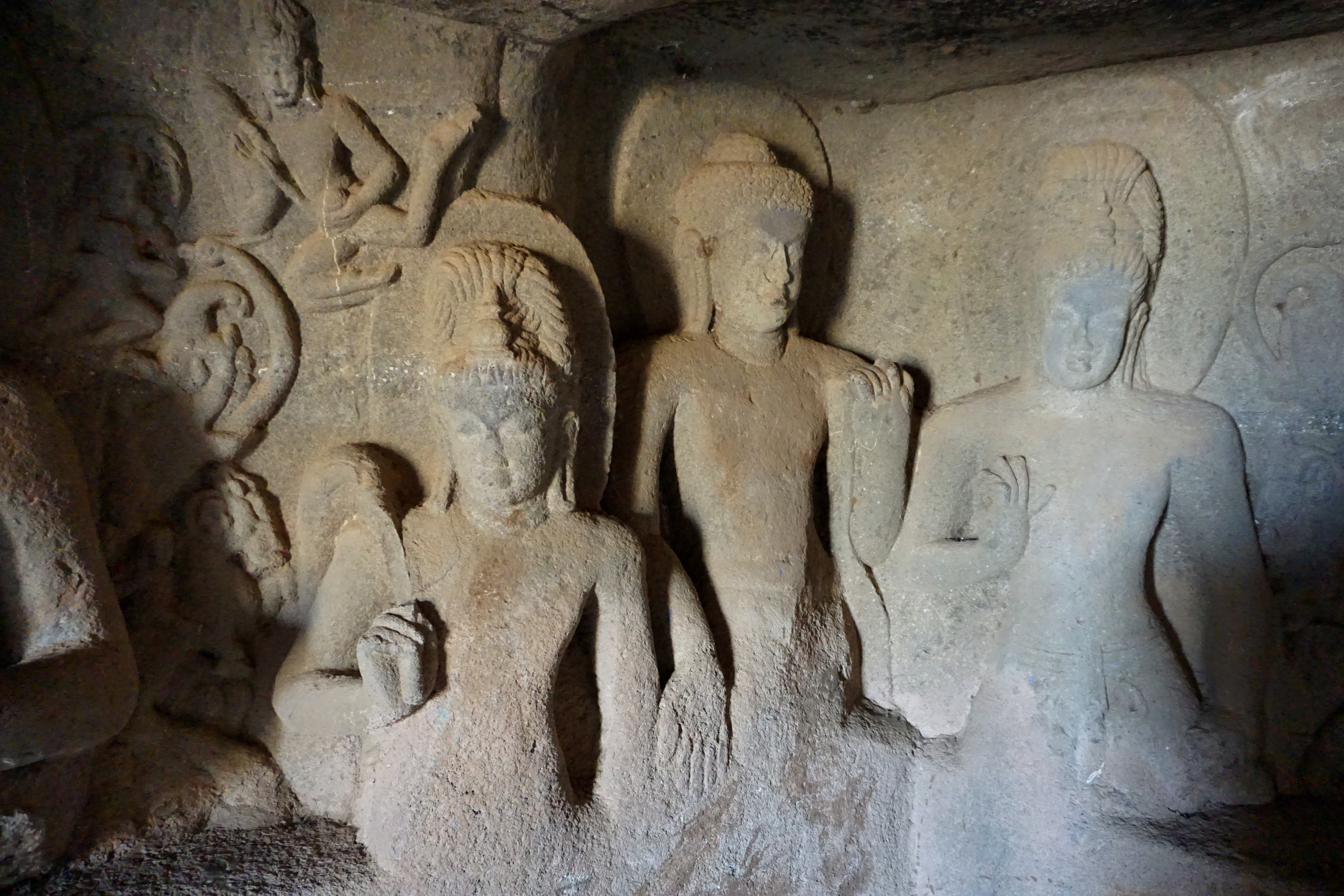
Buddhas and Bodhisattvas

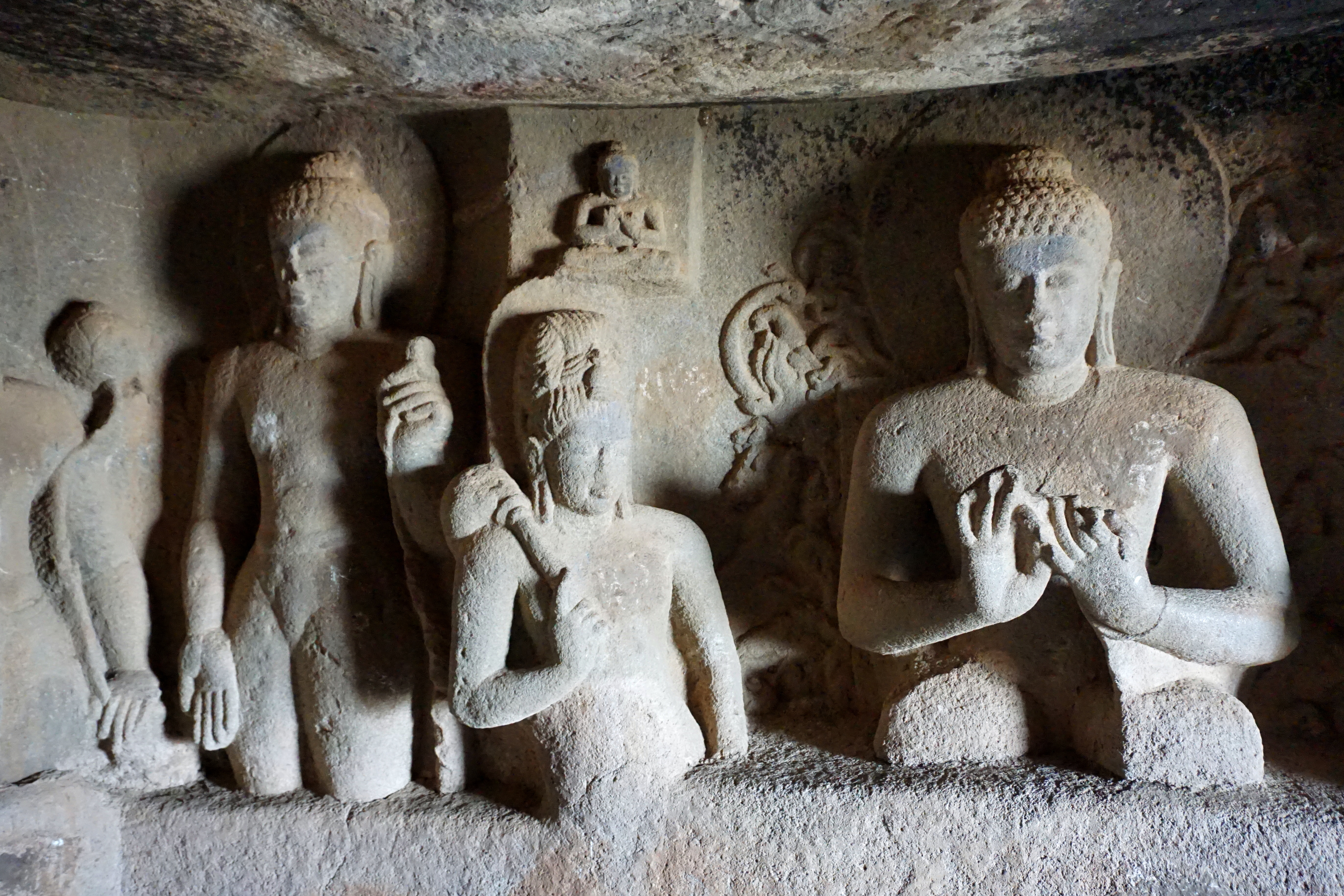
Buddhas and Bodhisattvas

== Routes ==
The caves are located high in the mountains of Trirashmi. Some caves are intricately connected by stone-cut ladders that join them to the other caves. Steps lead to the caves from the bottom of the hill. The peak of the Trirashmi Caves is also accessible by trekking of about 20 mins but the path is treacherous and dangerous.

== See also ==
- Cetiya
- Ajanta Caves
- Bedse Caves
- Bhaja Caves
- Kanheri Caves
- Karla Caves
- Pitalkhora Caves
- Shivneri Caves

== Sources ==
- Harle, J.C., The Art and Architecture of the Indian Subcontinent, 2nd edn. 1994, Yale University Press Pelican History of Art, ISBN 0300062176
- Michell, George, The Penguin Guide to the Monuments of India, Volume 1: Buddhist, Jain, Hindu, 1989, Penguin Books, ISBN 0140081445
- Singh, Upinder (2008). A History of Ancient and Early Medieval India: From the Stone Age to the 12th Century. Pearson Education India. ISBN 978-81-317-1120-0.
- Sinopoli, Carla M. (2001). "On the edge of empire: form and substance in the Satavahana dynasty". In Susan E. Alcock (ed.). Empires: Perspectives from Archaeology and History. Cambridge University Press. pp. 166–168. ISBN 9780521770200.
- Sudhakar Chattopadhyaya (1974). Some Early Dynasties of South India. Motilal Banarsidass. ISBN 978-81-208-2941-1.
