= E3 Series Shinkansen =

Japanese high speed train type

E3 series
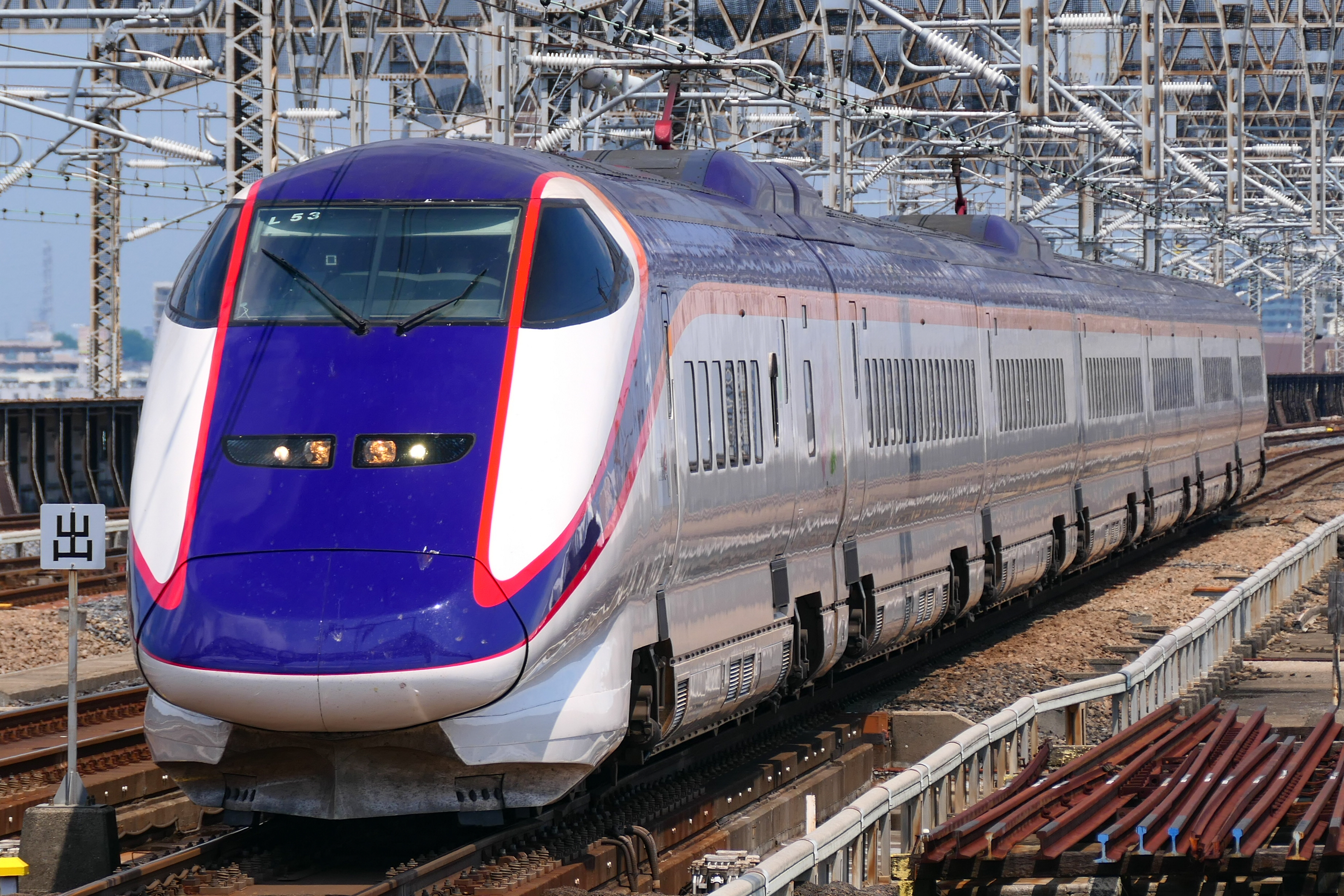
- Refurbished E3 Series train near Omiya Station
- In service: 22 March 1997 – present
- Manufacturers: Kawasaki Heavy Industries; Tokyu Car Corporation
- Designer: Kenji Ekuan
- Family name: Mini-Shinkansen
- Replaced: 400 series
- Constructed: 1995–2009
- Scrapped: 2013–2026
- Number built: 261 vehicles (41 sets)
- Number in service: 84 vehicles (12 sets) (as of March 2024)
- Number scrapped: 163 vehicles
- Successor: E6 and E8 series
- Formation: 7 cars per trainset; 6 cars per trainset (until 2022); 5 cars per trainset (Akita Shinkansen only, until 1998)
- Fleet numbers: R1–R26, L51–L55, L61–L72
- Capacity: 6-car R sets: 338 (23 Green + 315 Standard); 7-car L50 sets (E3-1000): 402 (23 Green + 379 ordinary); 7-car L60 sets (E3-2000): 394 (23 Green + 371 ordinary)
- Operators: JR East; National High Speed Rail Corporation Limited
- Depots: Akita, Yamagata
- Lines served: Yamagata Shinkansen (1999–2026); Akita Shinkansen (1997–2014); Tohoku Shinkansen; Jōetsu Shinkansen (2016-2020); Mumbai–Ahmedabad high-speed rail corridor

Specifications
- Car body construction: Aluminium
- Car length: 20.05 to 23.07 m (65 ft 9 in to 75 ft 8 in)
- Width: 2,945 mm (9 ft 8 in)
- Height: 4,080 mm (13 ft 5 in) (roof height); 4,280 mm (14 ft 1 in) (pantograph cover height)
- Floor height: 1,300 mm (4 ft 3 in)
- Doors: 1 per side
- Maximum speed: Operation: 275 km/h (171 mph); Design: 315 km/h (196 mph)
- Traction system: GTO or IGBT-VVVF (6-car sets: 16 x 300 kW, 7-car sets: 20 x 300 kW)
- Power output: 6-car sets: 4.8 MW (6,437 hp); 7-car sets: 6 MW (8,046 hp)
- Gear ratio: 28:85 (3.04)
- Acceleration: Tohoku Shinkansen: 1.6 km/(h⋅s) (0.99 mph/s); Yamagata Shinkansen: 2 km/(h⋅s) (1.2 mph/s)
- Deceleration: 5.2 km/(h⋅s) (3.2 mph/s)
- Electric systems: Overhead line: 25 kV 50 Hz AC; 20 kV 50 Hz AC
- Current collection: Pantograph
- Bogies: DT207 (1st generation motor car); DT207A (2nd to 4th generation motor car); DT207B (5th to 7th generation, 2000 series motor car); TR7005 (1st generation trailer car); TR7005A (2nd to 4th generation, 2000 series trailer car); TR7005B (5th to 7th generation trailer car)
- Braking systems: Regenerative brake combined with electrically controlled air brake and retarder brake (conventional line section)
- Safety systems: ATC-2, DS-ATC, ATS-P
- Multiple working: Up to two units: 200, E2, E4 or E5 series
- Track gauge: 1,435 mm (4 ft 8 1/2 in) standard gauge

The E3 series (Japanese: E3系) is a Japanese Shinkansen high-speed train type built for Komachi services introduced on 3 June 1997, coinciding with the opening of the new Akita Shinkansen, a so-called "mini-Shinkansen" line formed by regauging the 1,067 mm (3 ft 6 in) narrow-gauge line between Morioka and Akita to 1,435 mm (4 ft 8 1/2 in) standard gauge. Later variants of the E3 series were introduced for Tsubasa services on the Yamagata Shinkansen. Both mini-Shinkansen routes connect with the Tōhoku Shinkansen, providing through services to and from Tokyo.

== Design ==
The design of the E3 series was overseen by industrial designer Kenji Ekuan.

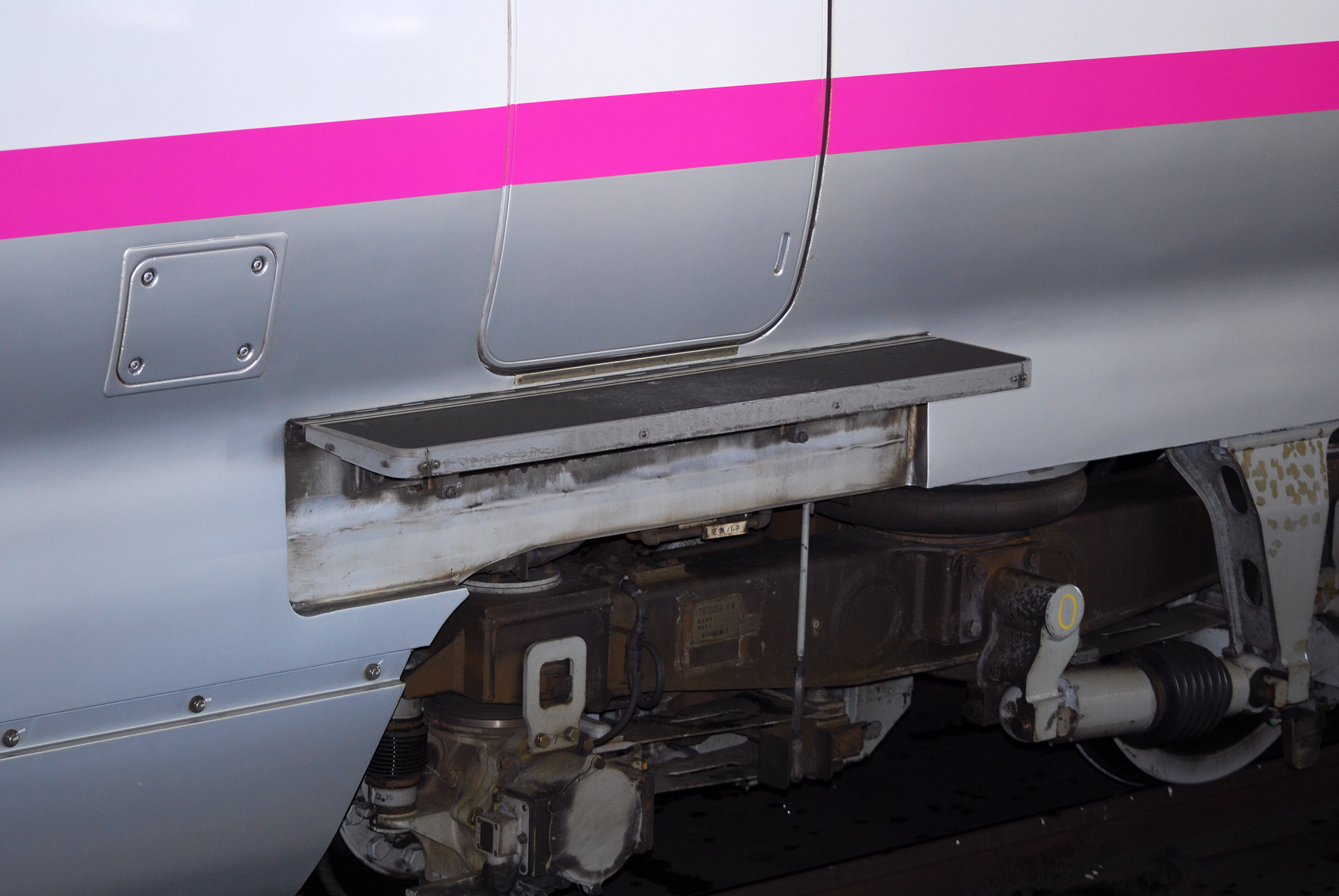
An extended gap filler on an E3 series Komachi set

Like the earlier 400 series, the E3 series was built to a smaller loading gauge than standard Shinkansen trains. Although the track gauge on the mini-Shinkansen routes was converted to standard gauge, platform positions were not altered, resulting in tighter clearances that restrict the width and length of each car. To compensate for the narrower car bodies, the trains are fitted with retractable gap fillers that flip up at standard Shinkansen stations to bridge the gap between the train and the platform.

The E3 series uses DT207 bolsterless bogies for motor cars and TR7005 bolsterless bogies for trailer cars, with their design being based on those used on the 400 Series. The wheel diameter is 860 mm, the wheelbase (distance between the two axles of a bogie) is 2,250 mm, and the axlebox suspension uses a support-plate system.

Starting with the production trains (2nd batch onward), the bogies were designated DT207A (motor bogie) and TR7005A (trailer bogie), reflecting revisions to the original designs. However, the motor bogies on the 0 and 1000 series 5th through 7th production batches, as well as on the 2000 series, were designated DT207B, while the trailer bogies on the 0 and 1000 series fifth through seventh production batches were designated TR7005B.

From spring 2014 to mid 2016 the remaining fleet of 15 E3-1000 and E3-2000 series sets used on Tsubasa services were gradually repainted into a new livery designed by industrial designer and Yamagata native Ken Okuyama, intended to reflect the landscape and cultural identity of Yamagata Prefecture. The body is finished in white, symbolising the snow of Mount Zaō; deep purple, inspired by the Mandarin duck, the prefectural bird of Yamagata; and accents of red and yellow derived from the safflower, the prefectural flower. This same livery was applied to the later E8 series which is slated to replace the E3. On 11 February 2023, as the E3 series neared retirement, one set was repainted as a heritage unit in the original silver and green livery.

== Variants ==
- E3-0 series "R" sets: 26 × 6-car sets (R1–R16 initially delivered as 5-car sets) used on Akita Shinkansen Komachi services from 3 June 1997 to 14 March 2014.
- E3-1000 series "LR" sets: 3 × 7-car sets used on Yamagata Shinkansen Tsubasa services from 4 December 1999. Two E3-1000 sets L51 and L52 were withdrawn in 2014 and E3-0 sets R23–R26 were converted into L54 and L55 and entered service as replacements.
- E3-2000 series "LR" sets: 12 × 7-car sets used on Yamagata Shinkansen Tsubasa services since 20 December 2008. All sets were repainted between 2014 and 2016.
- E3-700 series Toreiyu: 6-car excursion set used on the Yamagata Shinkansen from July 2014 to March 2022.
- E3-700 series Genbi Shinkansen: 6-car excursion set used on the Jōetsu Shinkansen from 29 April 2016 to December 2020.

== Pre-series set ==
A pre-series 5-car set, numbered S8, was delivered from Kawasaki Heavy Industries to Sendai Depot in March 1995 for extensive testing. It was modified to full-production specifications in March 1997 ahead of the start of Akita Shinkansen services.

Until it was augmented to six cars in 1998, the pre-series was formed as follows, with scissors-type pantographs on cars 12, 13, and 14. Set R1 was withdrawn following its final revenue run on 20 July 2013.

=== Set R1 (set S8 before conversion) (1st batch) ===
- The front end of the lead car differs from that of mass-produced trains and resembles the design of the 400 Series. (Note: It tapers toward the coupler cover and has a rounded shape.)
- The headlights and rear marker lights are located above the cab window, and two auxiliary lights (high intensity discharge lamps) under the cab window. The auxiliary lights (HID lights) were adopted on a trial basis after drivers of the previous 400 series pointed out the need for improved illumination on conventional lines.
- At the time of completion, the trains were equipped with three lower-frame cross-type pantographs: the E326-1 and E325-1 were fitted with the PS9034 type for Shinkansen sections, while the E329-1 was fitted with the PS204X type for conventional-line sections. These were replaced with single-arm pantographs during modifications for mass production.
- On June 24, 1995, test runs were conducted with E326-1 equipped with a prototype pantograph that featured an additional arm attached to a single-arm pantograph. At a Shinkansen event held in Sendai on July 23 of the same year, E325-1 was displayed with its pantograph replaced from the prototype design to a PS206-type single-arm pantograph
- The pantograph covers on the E326-1 and E325-1 are equipped with a pneumatic cylinder-driven mechanism that allows them to move up and down. This allows the covers to be lowered during operation on conventional-line sections to avoid interfering with the vehicle clearance limits, and raised by 200 mm during operation on Shinkansen sections. The E329-1 has a fixed cover because it is a pantograph for conventional lines. Since E329-1 is equipped with a pantograph designed for conventional rail sections, its cover is fixed.
- The toilets in the men's restrooms are installed at an angle.
- The logo at the time of delivery was “Series E3” (later changed to the same logo as the mass-produced sets).
- The size of the static electricity antenna on Car 11 (E311-1) differs from that of the mass-produced sets.
- At the time of completion, the plan was to first transport the units manufactured by Kawasaki Heavy Industries to Zushi via special transport and then deliver them together with those manufactured by Tokyu Car Corporation, however, due to delays in the Kawasaki Heavy Industries units caused by the Great Hanshin Earthquake, the units manufactured by Tokyu Car Corporation were delivered first.
- Test runs were conducted on the Yamagata Shinkansen prior to the modifications for mass production.
- With the introduction of the E6 series, this set ceased commercial operation on July 20, 2013 and was scrapped.

Car No.	11	12	13	14	15
Designation	M1sc	M2	T	M1	M2c
Numbering	E311-1	E326-1	E329-1	E325-1	E322-1

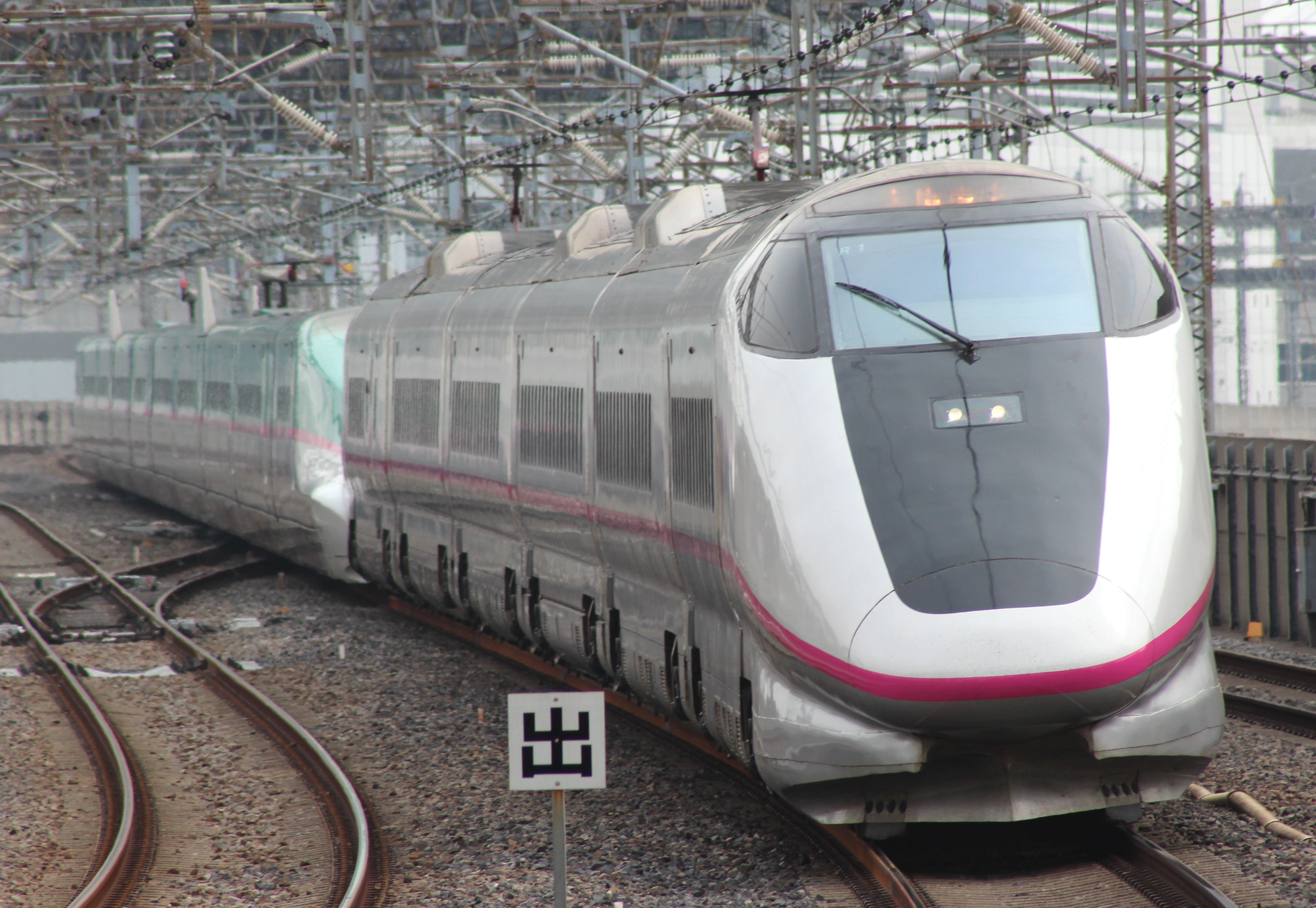
Pre-series set R1 in service, March 2013

== E3 series "R" sets ==
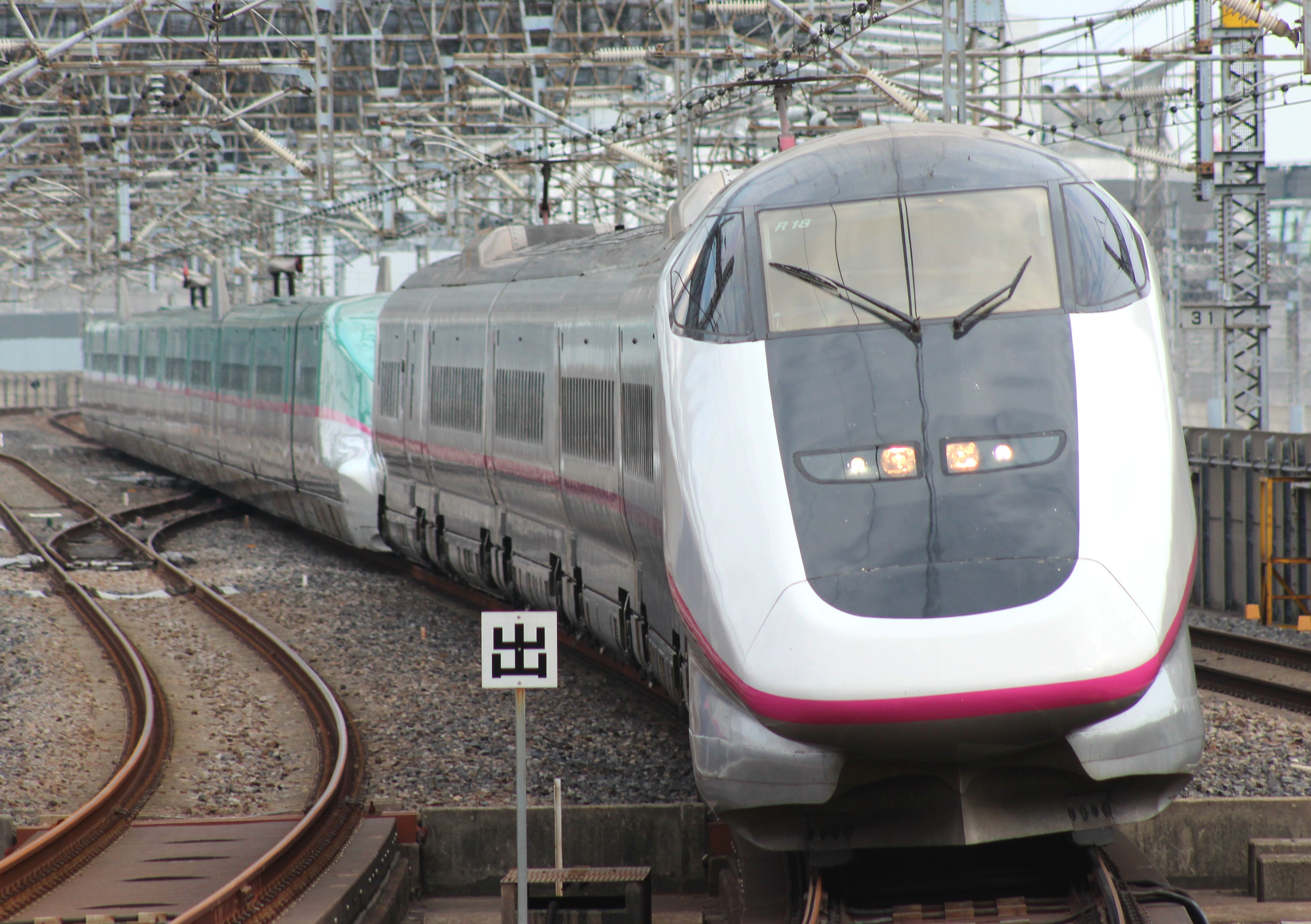
Set R18 coupled to an E5 series set on a Hayate/Komachi service in June 2013

The full-production trainsets built from 1996 for the Akita Shinkansen were 5-car sets, but a sixth car were added by the end of 1998. A total of 26 Akita Shinkansen sets were in service by the end of 2005. Sets R1 to R16 were leased by East Japan Railway Company (JR East) from the owning company, Akita Shinkansen Sharyō Hoyū (秋田新幹線車両保有(株); lit. 'Akita Shinkansen Rolling Stock Co., Ltd.'), a third-sector company jointly owned by JR East and Akita Prefecture. This lease ended on 21 March 2010 with the dissolution of Akita Shinkansen Sharyō Hoyū.

The E3 series sets were phased out following the introduction of new E6 series sets from March 2013, with 19 sets (114 vehicles) scheduled to be withdrawn during fiscal 2013. From the start of the 15 March 2014 timetable revision, E3 series trainsets were no longer used on Akita Shinkansen Komachi services. Two sets (R21 and R22) were used on Yamabiko and Nasuno services coupled to the E5/H5 series in their original "Komachi" colors before being retired on 31 October 2020. This is believed to have happened due to the decrease in passengers caused by the COVID-19 pandemic.

=== Sets R2 - R16 (2nd batch) ===
These mass-produced sets were completed before the opening of the Akita Shinkansen in March 1997. They were originally five-car sets, but were lengthened to six cars by coupling new E328 series (3rd generation) cars between October and December of the following year. As a result, an insulator cover (renamed from "pantograph cover" on the production sets) without a pantograph is located at the connection between the E329 and E328 cars (Cars 13 and 14). (The same applies to R1; it is the second cover shown in the photo above).

- To counteract micro-pressure waves in tunnels and reduce noise, the front end design of the lead car was modified.
- The headlights and rear marker lights were grouped together below the driver's cab window. The high-intensity discharge (HID) lamps had been experimentally installed on the pre-production set, but they were officially adopted starting with the production vehicles.
- The passenger compartment is nearly identical to that of the pre-production set, but in the production sets, the side window curtains feature a woven design inspired by the Akita Kanto Festival.
- The trash bins installed on each deck were divided into three categories: bottles and cans, newspapers and magazines, and general waste. Since the Akita Shinkansen trains operate for long periods, a garbage compactor was added to compress the general waste every 15 minutes to prevent waste from overflowing.
- While the Green Cars on the pre-production set were equipped with spot air conditioning (individual climate control) above the seats, this feature was omitted in the production sets.
- The layout of the equipment in the driver’s cab was significantly revised.
- A newly developed, low-noise PS206-type single-arm pantograph was adopted. Since the pantograph itself was designed to be low noise, the vertically adjustable pantograph cover found on the pre-production set was removed, and a new, sloped “insulator cover” was installed to protect the insulators and cable heads from airflow.
- Since the 2nd batch trainsets were completed before the opening of the Akita Shinkansen, they underwent test runs on the Yamagata Shinkansen.
- The E328 type (T2) cars, which were added in 1998, are trailer (non-powered) cars generally based on the earlier E329 type (T1). However, because they do not carry an auxiliary power supply unit, which reduced their axle load, their floor panels were made of steel instead of aluminum honeycomb material, and additional deadweight (ballast) was installed to compensate.

=== Set R17 (3rd batch) ===
Additional set completed in 1998. This set was added to increase transportation capacity following the timetable revision at the end of the same year. Sets completed after and including set R17 were built as six-car formations.

- The terminal covers located at the coupling points between the E329 and E328 series (Cars 13 and 14) were omitted, reducing the total number of terminal covers to two.
- The driver's cab is equipped with 2 wipers, which includes an auxiliary wiper.
- Up to and including this trainset, the VVVF inverter control system used GTO thyristors. Among the trainsets completetd after R17 which incorporated these changes, this set was the only one to retain its GTO thyristors.
- During the summer holiday season in 2008, as part of a collaboration project with All Nippon Airways (ANA), the set was wrapped in a "Pokémon Pika-Nori Summer" design along with the set R21.

=== Sets R18 - R23 (5th batch) ===
These additional sets were delivered between 2002 (Heisei 14) and 2003 (Heisei 15) to increase transport capacity and replace the later production batches of the unmodified 200 Series trains. (Note: The earlier production models were replaced with E2 Series "J" set trains and E4 Series trains.) The main differences from Sets R17 and earlier are listed below. In terms of specifications, the 4th batch sets (1000-series L51 and L52 sets) for the Yamagata Shinkansen were manufactured between the 3rd and 5th batch sets, and the improvements made to those sets were also incorporated.

- The dynamic dampers used in the trailing cars of the 4th batch trains were omitted, and ride comfort was improved through the use of underfloor dead weight and roof-mounted vibration-damping materials.
- The material of the inter-car curtains was changed from polyurethane to synthetic rubber.
- Footrests were installed in front of the seats in standard-class cars. (Note: Up until set R17, this feature was only available in green cars.)
- The seat design was changed to one featuring a sliding seat cushion. (Note: It is the same type used on the E257 series and the 5th batch of the 253 series, which were manufactured around the same time.)
- The main power converter elements were changed from GTO thyristors to IGBTs, similar to the E2 Series 1000-series.
- From their manufacture, the sets were equipped with DS-ATC and digital train radio.
- Cars 11 and 16 were equipped with full-active suspension, while cars 12–15 were equipped with semi-active suspension.
- Grips were provided on the seat shoulders. (Note: The shape of the grips differs between Green Cars and regular cars.)
- A door chime was added.
- The toilet in Car 11 was replaced with a heated bidet toilet seat.
- The specifications of the men's restroom had been changed. (Only for sets R18-R23 (Note: Sets R24-R26 returned to the same specifications as the earlier R2–R17 trainsets.))

=== R24 - R26 train (6th batch) ===
These additional sets were completed in 2005 (Heisei 17) to increase transportation capacity and replace the 200 series H formations (the 12-car H4 and H5 formations) that had been used for peak passenger season special trains (along with the simultaneously added E2 Series 1000-series J66–J68 sets and the 1000-series L53 set for the Yamagata Shinkansen).

- Some materials were changed to enhance fire safety measures.
- The support posts for the luggage racks, which had been installed every three seats, were omitted.
- Baby changing stations were installed in the restrooms.
- Braille labels and tactile maps for the visually impaired were installed in the aisles and restrooms.
- To accommodate VIP guests, the E311 end car was prepared for the future installation of a police radio antenna on its roof.

=== Formation ===
Car No.	11	12	13	14	15	16
Designation	M1sc	M2	T1	T2	M1	M2c
Numbering	E311	E326	E329	E328	E325	E322
Seating capacity	23	67	60	68	64	56

Cars 12 and 15 were equipped with PS206 single-arm pantographs.

=== Fleet history ===
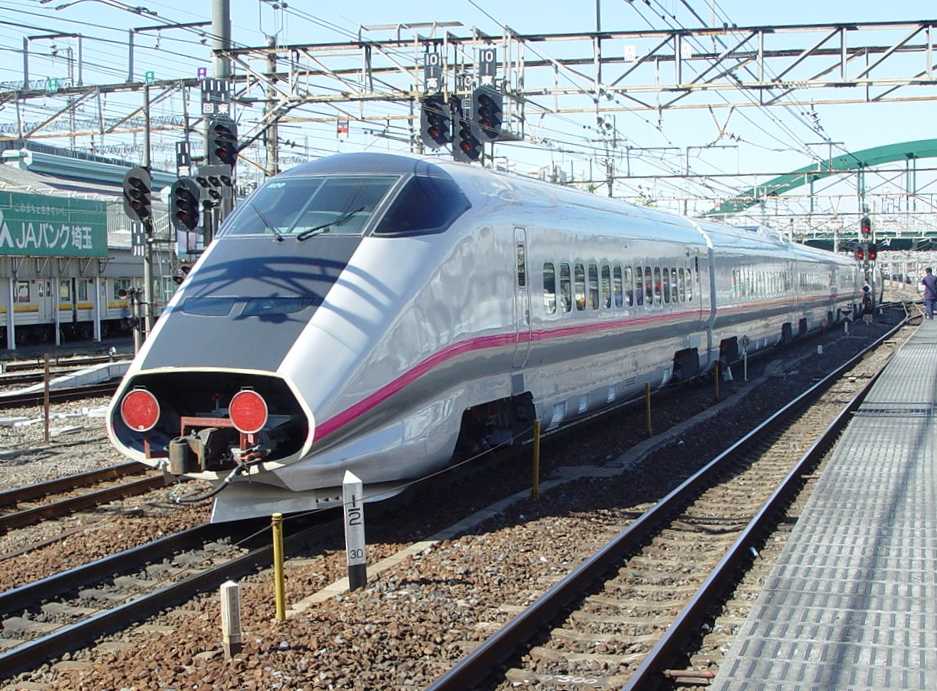
Set R20 being hauled through Omiya Station on delivery in March 2003

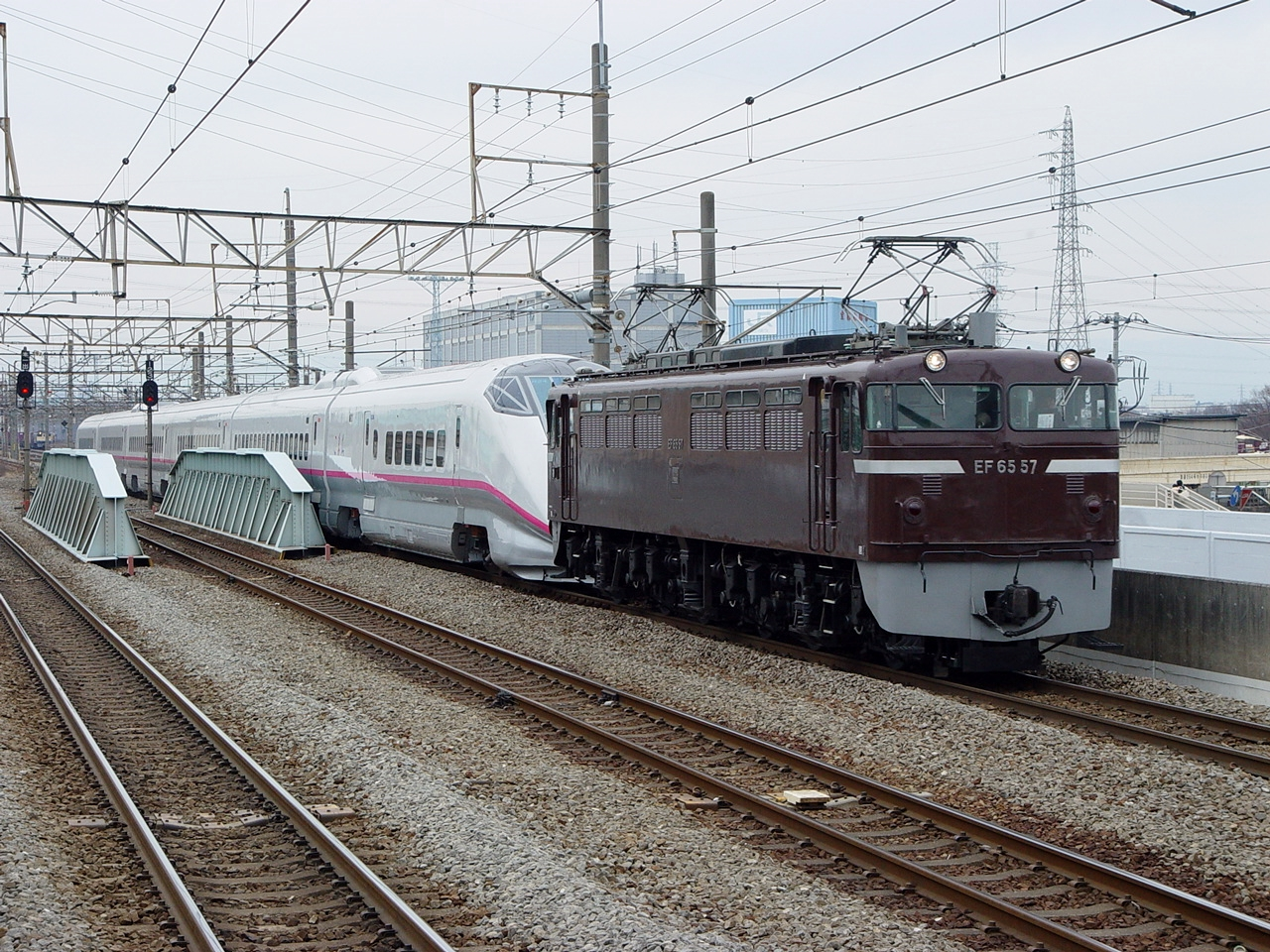
Set R24 being delivered in March 2005

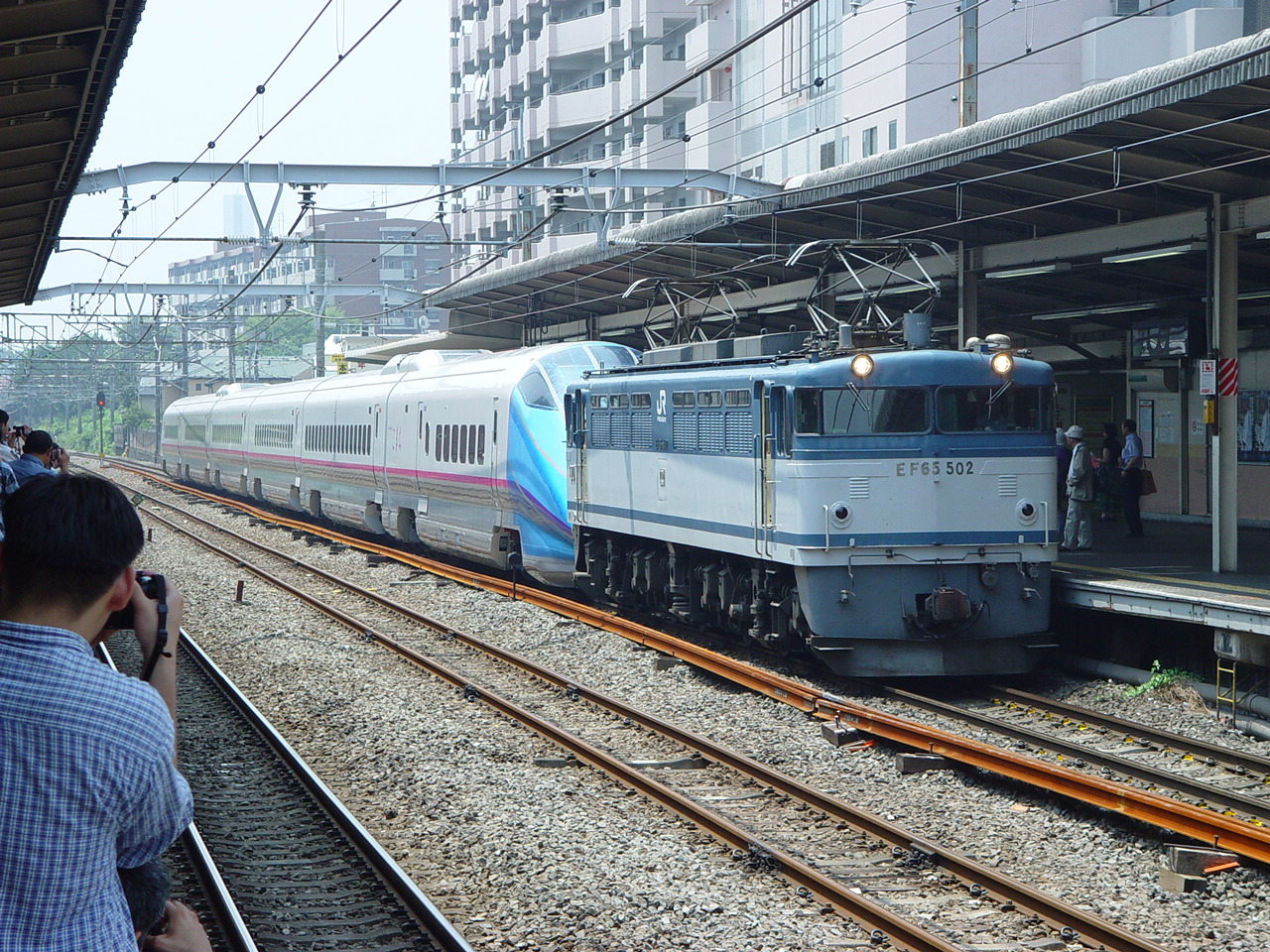
Set R25 being hauled by JNR Class EF65 through Nishi-Kokubunji Station on delivery in June 2005

The build details are as shown below. As of 25 November 2021, the last of the original 26 sets (R22) was scrapped.

Set	Delivered	6th car added	Withdrawn	Remarks
R1	28 March 1995	29 October 1998	26 August 2013	Pre-series set S8 (originally 5 cars with 3 pantographs)
R2	9 October 1996	1 November 1998	13 December 2013	Built as 5-car sets
R3	14 October 1996	4 November 1998	17 February 2014	Built as 5-car sets
R4	22 October 1996	6 November 1998	9 January 2014	Built as 5-car sets
R5	28 October 1996	9 November 1998	26 April 2013	Built as 5-car sets
R6	6 November 1996	12 November 1998	12 April 2013	Built as 5-car sets
R7	11 November 1996	22 November 1998	17 May 2013	Built as 5-car sets
R8	15 November 1996	24 November 1998	24 May 2013	Built as 5-car sets
R9	22 November 1996	26 November 1998	7 June 2013	Built as 5-car sets
R10	2 December 1996	28 November 1998	27 August 2013	Built as 5-car sets
R11	12 December 1996	30 October 1998	13 September 2013	Built as 5-car sets
R12	21 December 1996	17 November 1998	27 November 2013	Built as 5-car sets
R13	20 January 1997	5 December 1998	19 October 2013	Built as 5-car sets
R14	30 January 1997	14 November 1998	1 December 2013	Built as 5-car sets
R15	7 February 1997	16 November 1998	28 January 2014	Built as 5-car sets
R16	17 February 1997	19 November 1998	8 March 2014	Built as 5-car sets
R17	30 September 1998	—N/a	26 July 2013	
R18	23 October 2002	—N/a	6 March 2022	Converted 2014 to E3-700 series Toreiyu
R19	18 November 2002	—N/a	1 March 2021	Converted 2016 to E3-700 series Genbi Shinkansen
R20	24 March 2003	—N/a	17 December 2015	
R21	16 September 2003	—N/a	13 September 2021	
R22	27 October 2003	—N/a	25 November 2021	
R23	1 December 2003	—N/a	25 May 2014	Converted 2014 to become Set L55
R24	4 April 2005	—N/a	4 December 2013 (Note: Cars 11 and 14-16)	Converted 2014 to become Set L54
R25	11 July 2005	—N/a	18 December 2013 (Note: Car 14)	Converted 2014 to become Set L54
R26	25 July 2005	—N/a	6 July 2014	Converted 2014 to become Set L55

=== Interior ===
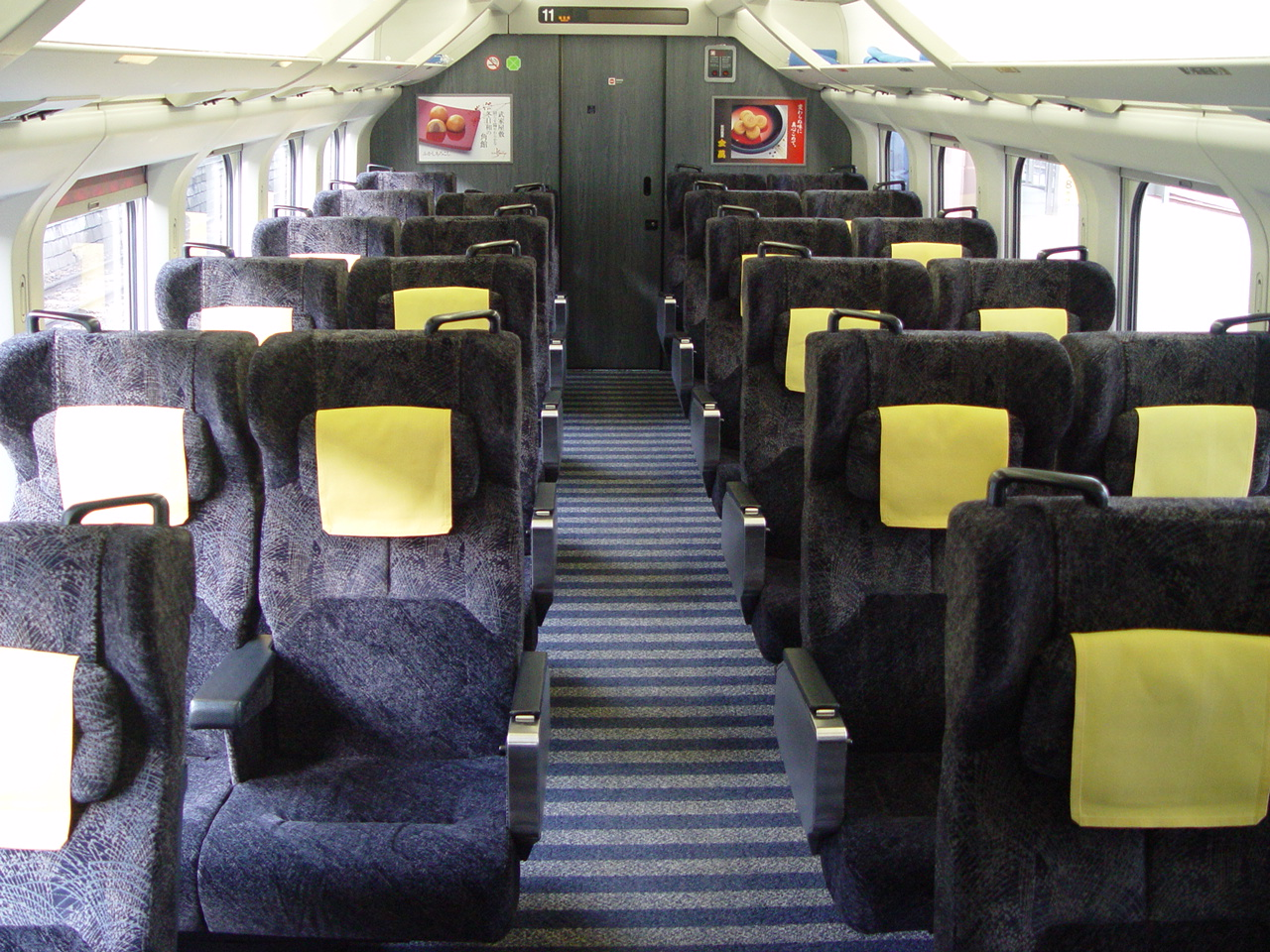
Green car interior

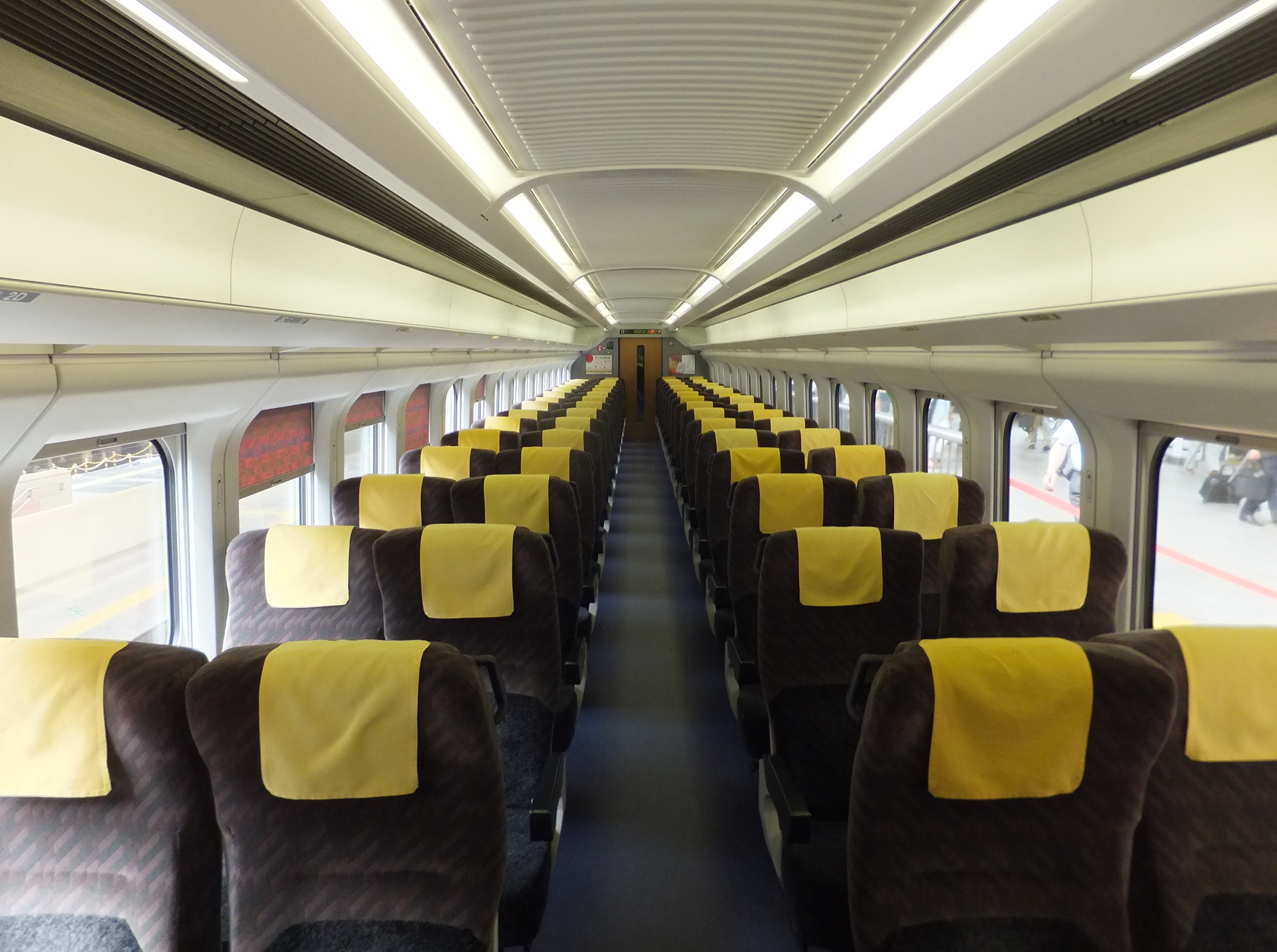
Interior of standard-class car 12

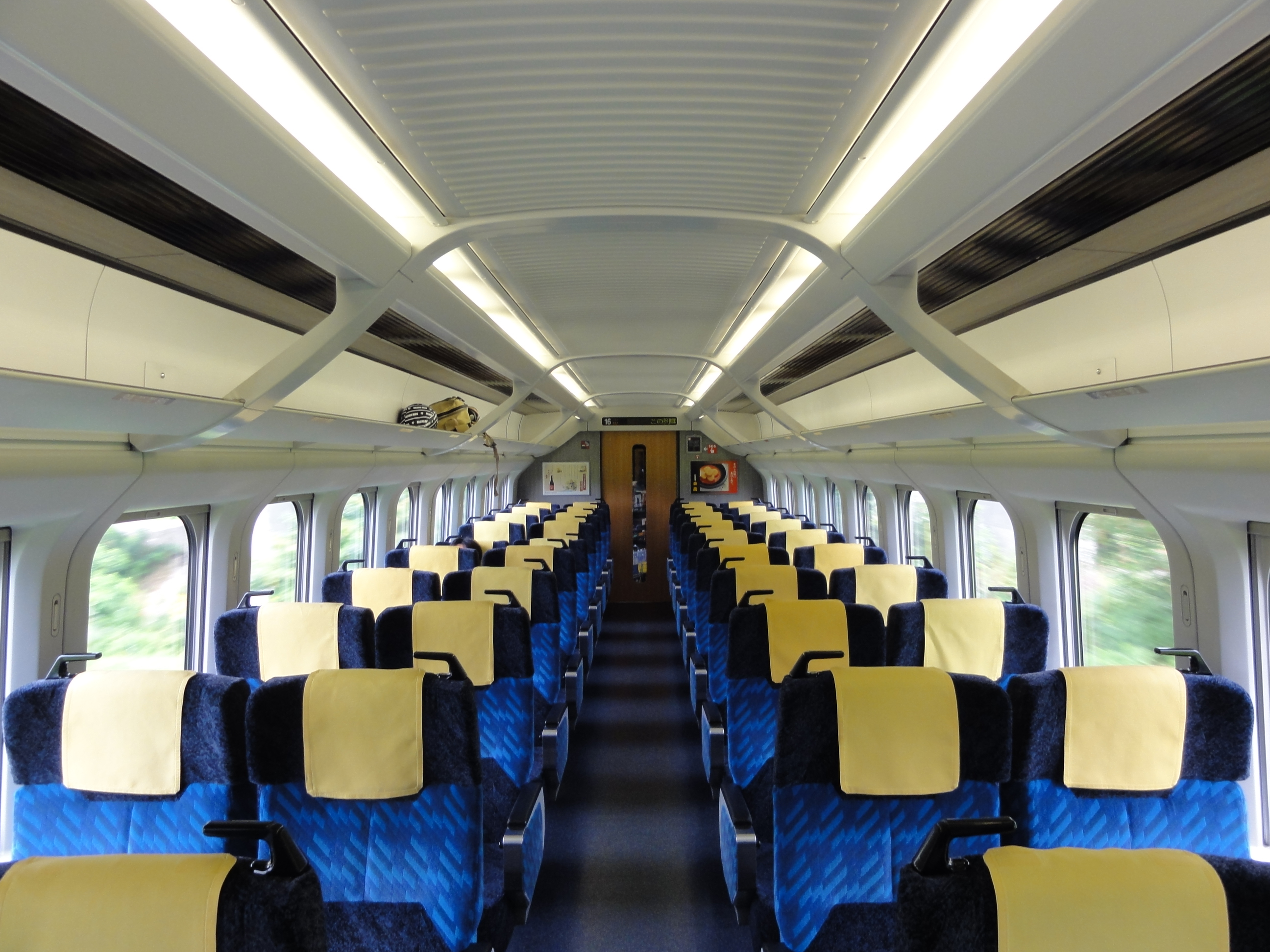
Interior of standard-class car 16

== E3-1000 series ==
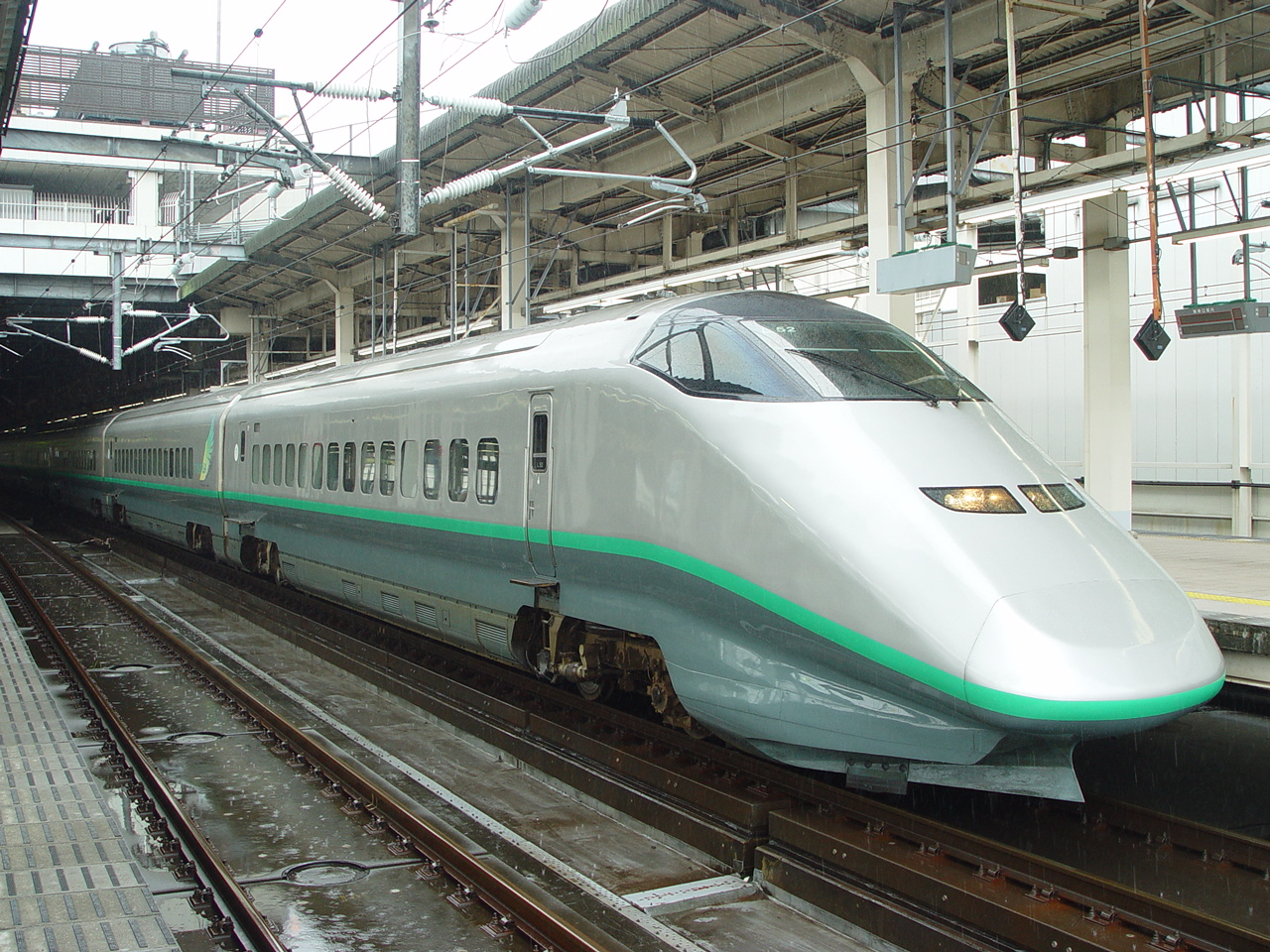
E3-1000 series set L52 on a Tsubasa service in July 2006

Three 7-car E3-1000 sets (numbered L51 – L53) were built between 1999 and 2005 for use on Yamagata Shinkansen Tsubasa services from 4 December 1999 to augment the 400 series fleet following with the extension of the line to Shinjo. From 2014, a further two sets (L54 and L55) were introduced, reformed from withdrawn Akita Shinkansen E3-0 series "R" sets, to replace the two older sets L51 and L52.

With effect of the timetable revision implemented in March 2024, following the introduction of the E8 Series Shinkansen, all remaining E3-1000 series trains were withdrawn from regular service.

=== Sets L51 and 52 (4th batch) ===
These sets were added to the fleet in 1999 for the opening of the Shinjo extension. While their electrical equipment and windshield wipers are similar to those of the R17 set of the 0 series, their interior design and other features were designed specifically for Yamagata Shinkansen service. The powered seat-rotation mechanism was only provisioned for future installation (the equipment itself was not fitted), and these sets are not equipped with trash compactors.

=== Set L53 (7th batch) ===
Completed in 2005, L53 retained an interior almost identical to the 4th batch L51 and L52 trainsets. However, because the 5th batch Akita Shinkansen trainsets (R18–R23) had been introduced in the interim, its electrical systems and onboard equipment were updated to the same specifications as the contemporaneously built 6th batch Akita Shinkansen trainsets (R24–R26). Unlike the 4th batch trainsets, which used an applied film for the green stripe, L53 received a painted stripe. It was also the only newly built 1000-series trainset delivered in the new livery.

=== Formation ===
The sets were formed as shown below, with five motored ("M") cars and two non-powered trailer ("T") cars, and car 11 at the Tokyo end.

Car No.	11	12	13	14	15	16	17
Designation	M1sc	M2	T1	M2	T2	M1	M2c
Numbering	E311-1000	E326-1000	E329-1000	E326-1100	E328-1000	E325-1000	E322-1000
Seating capacity	23	67	60	68	64	64	56

Cars 12 and 14 were equipped with PS206 single-arm pantographs.

=== Interior ===
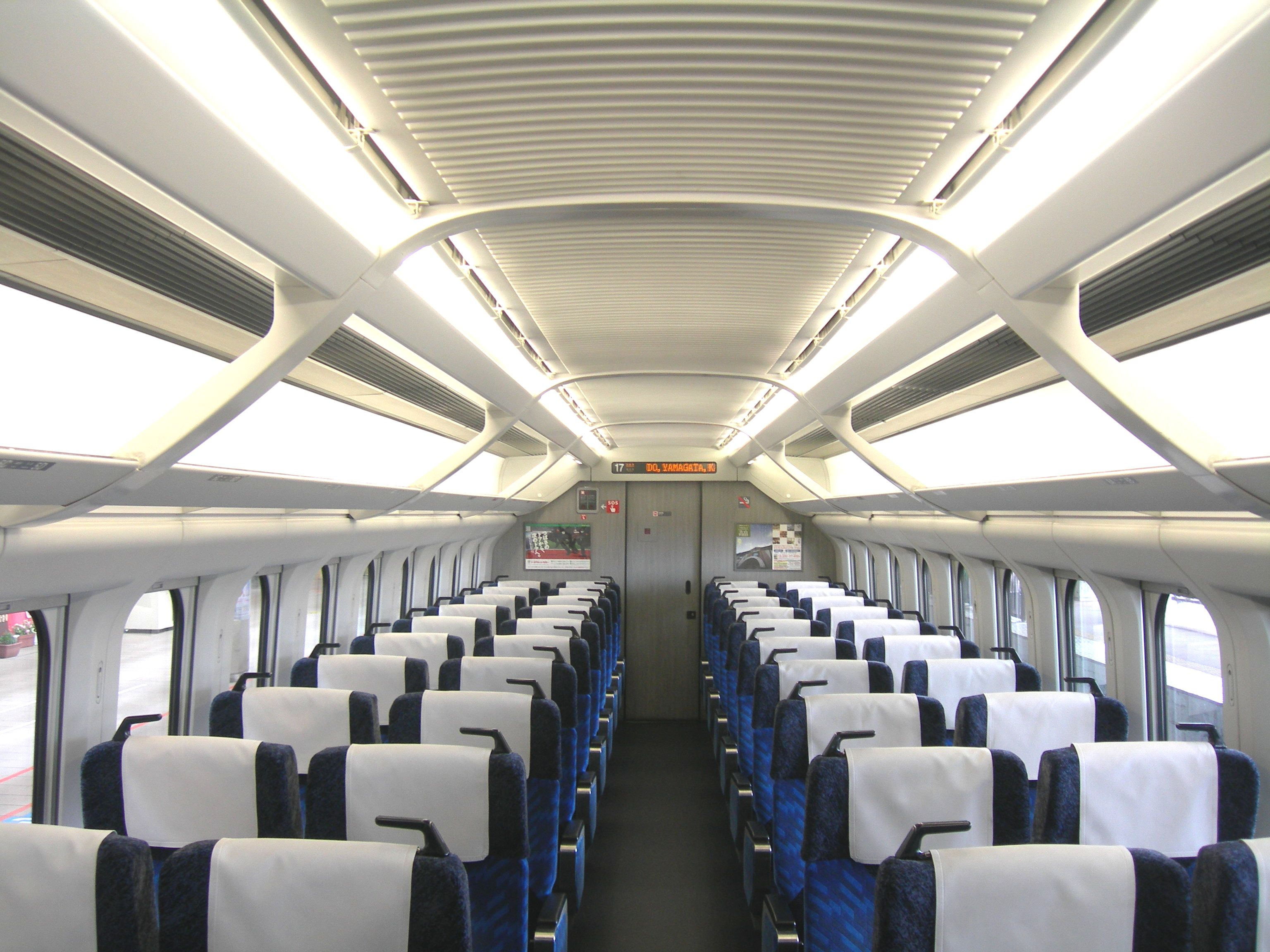
Standard class car interior

=== Fleet history ===
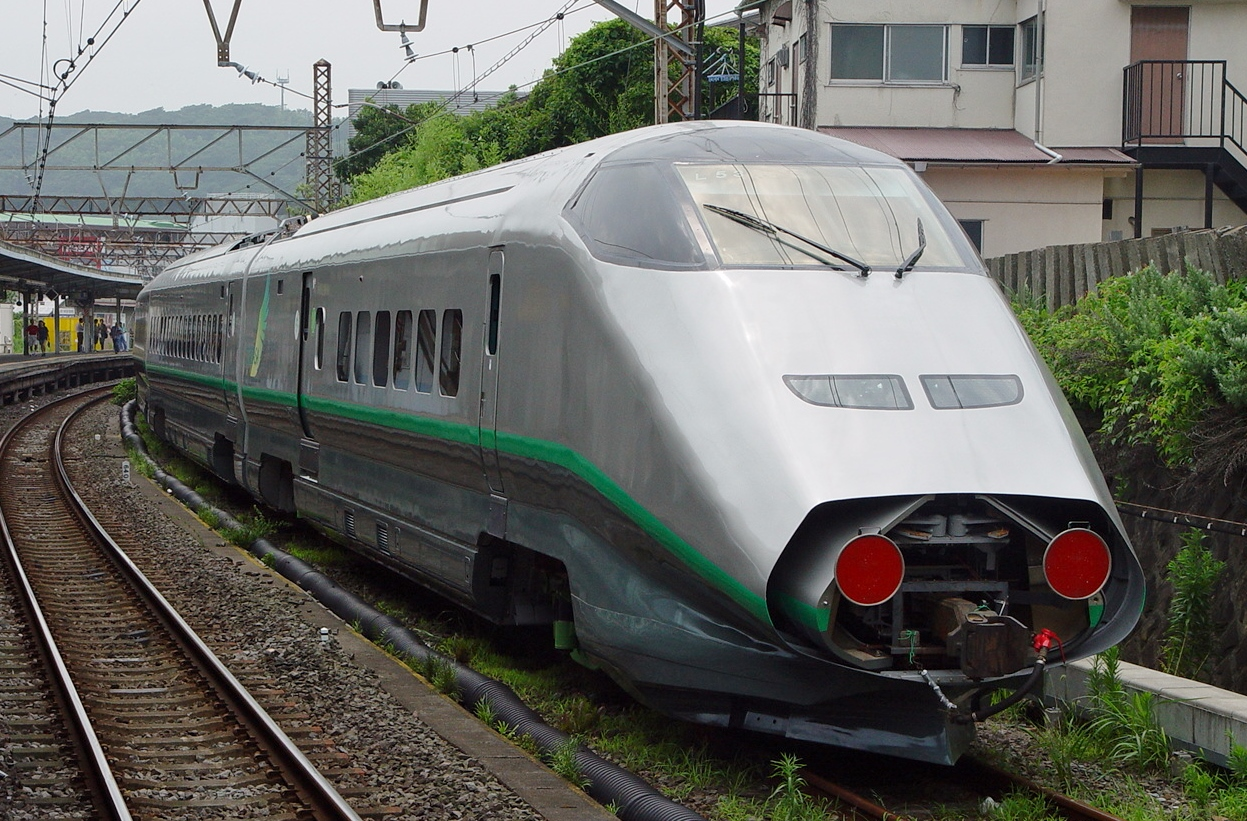
Set L53 on delivery from Tokyu Car in July 2005

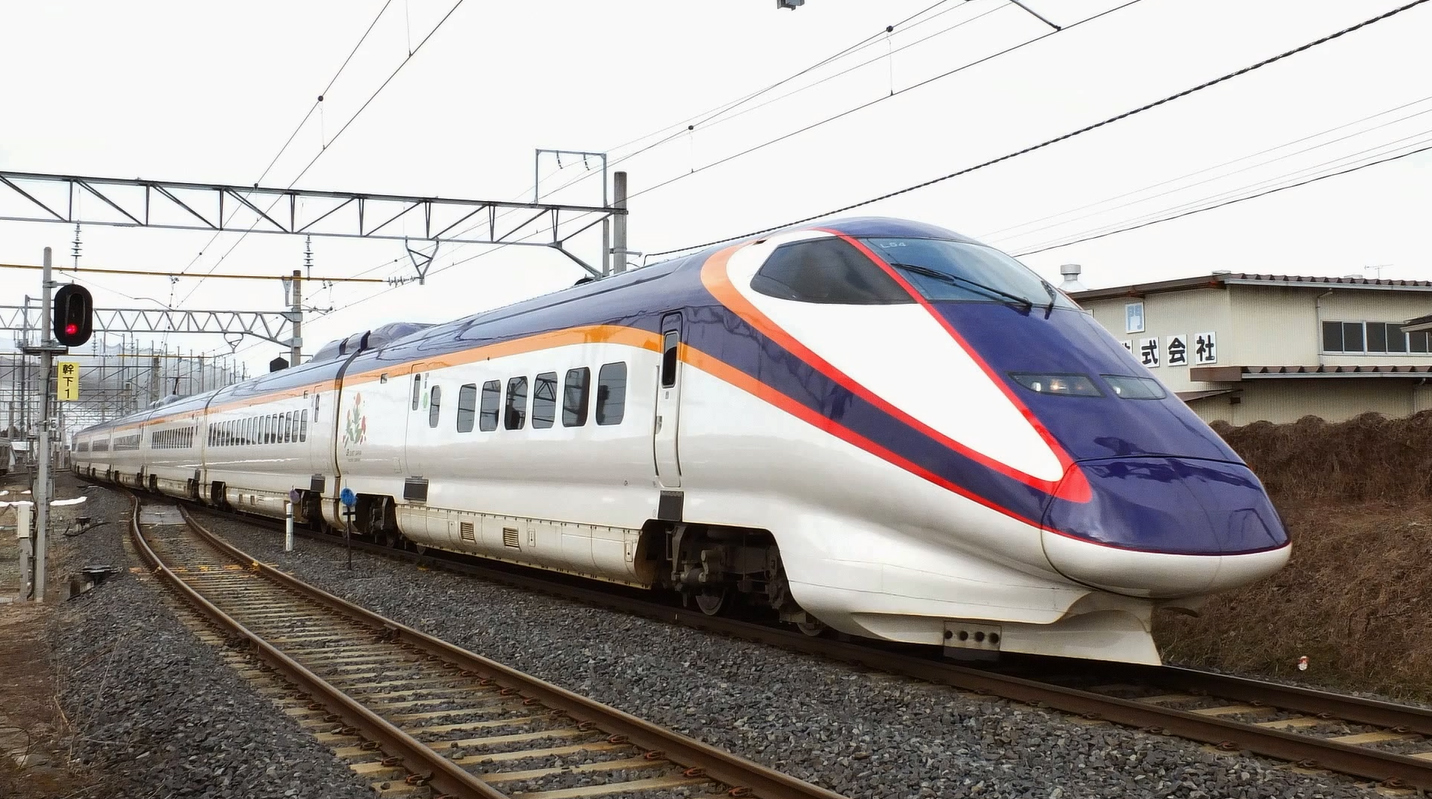
Set L54, rebuilt from sets R24 and R25, in March 2015

The build details are as shown below.

Set	Manufacturer	Delivered	Repainted	Withdrawn	Notes
L51	Tokyu Car	11 August 1999	—N/a	5 September 2014	
L52	Kawasaki	11 September 1999	—N/a	4 February 2015	
L53	Tokyu Car	17 August 2005	24 November 2015	18 March 2024	
L54	Kawasaki	30 July 2014		15 May 2024	Rebuilt from sets R24 and R25
L55	J-TREC	13 January 2015		15 May 2024	Rebuilt from sets R23 and R26

== E3-2000 series ==
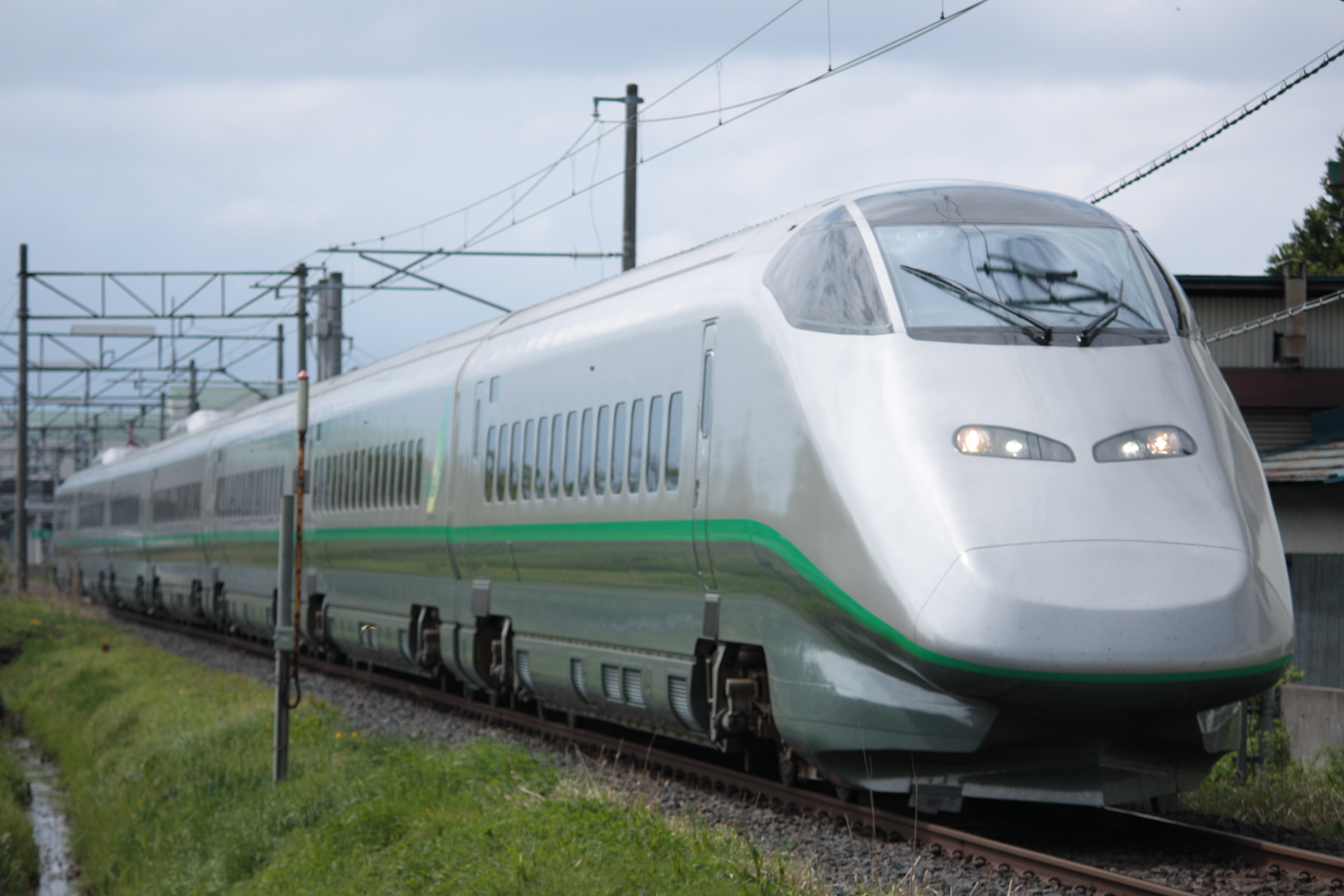
E3-2000 series set L67 in original livery in May 2009

The first of a fleet of twelve new E3-2000 series 7-car sets entered service on Yamagata Shinkansen Tsubasa services on 20 December 2008. The new fleet totally replaced the older 400 series trains by summer 2009. The new trains incorporate design improvements, including active suspension, full-color LED destination indicators, and AC power outlets in all cars. Seating capacity in cars 16 and 17 has been reduced by 4 (one row of seats) compared with the E3-1000 series to provide uniform seating pitch in all cars (seat pitch was previously reduced in non-reserved cars).

=== Formation ===
Car No.	11	12	13	14	15	16	17
Designation	M1sc	M2	T1	M2	T2	M1	M2c
Numbering	E311-2000	E326-2000	E329-2000	E326-2100	E328-2000	E325-2000	E322-2000
Seating capacity	23	67	60	68	64	60	52

Cars 12 and 14 are equipped with PS206 single-arm pantographs.

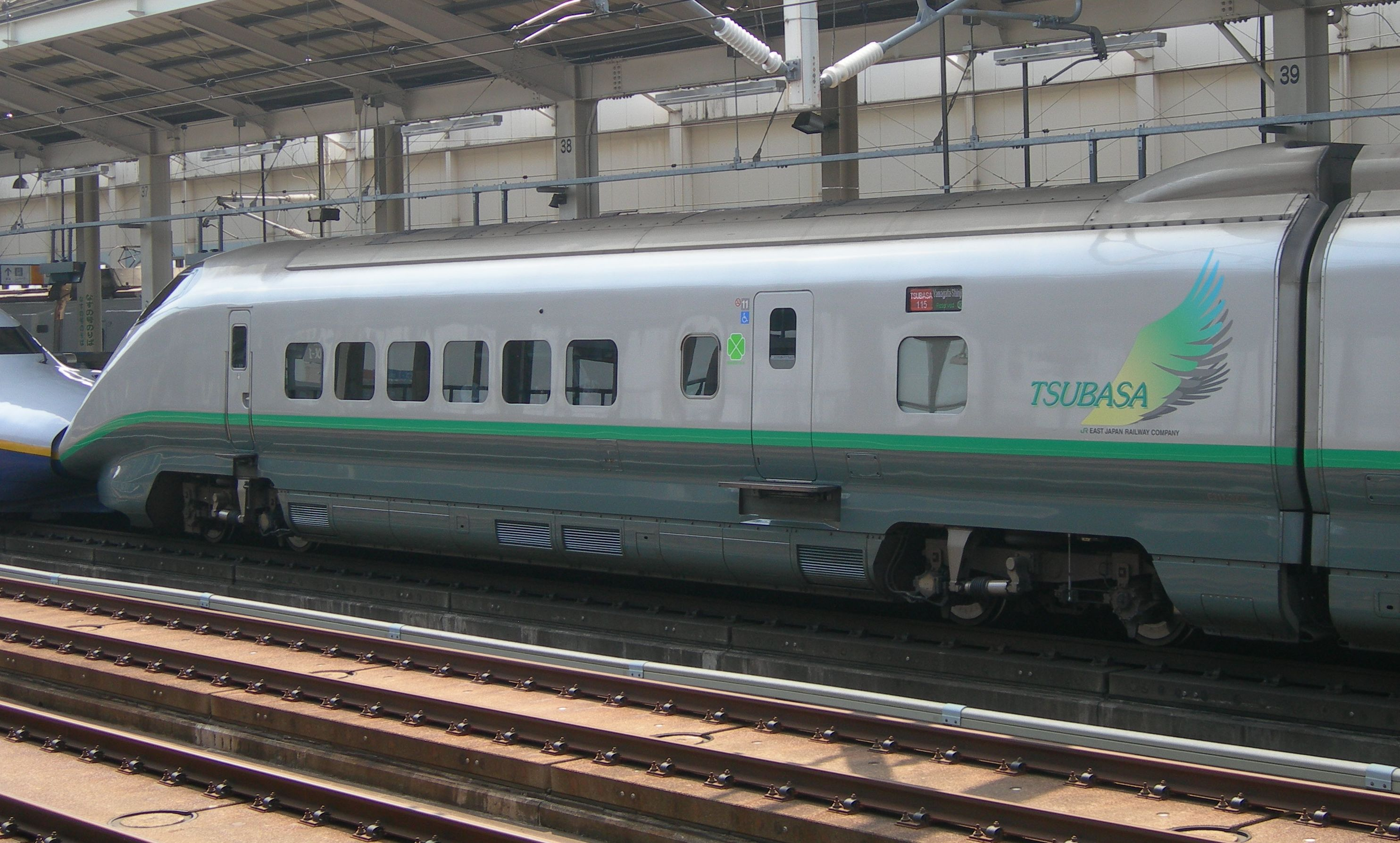
E311-2009 (car 11)

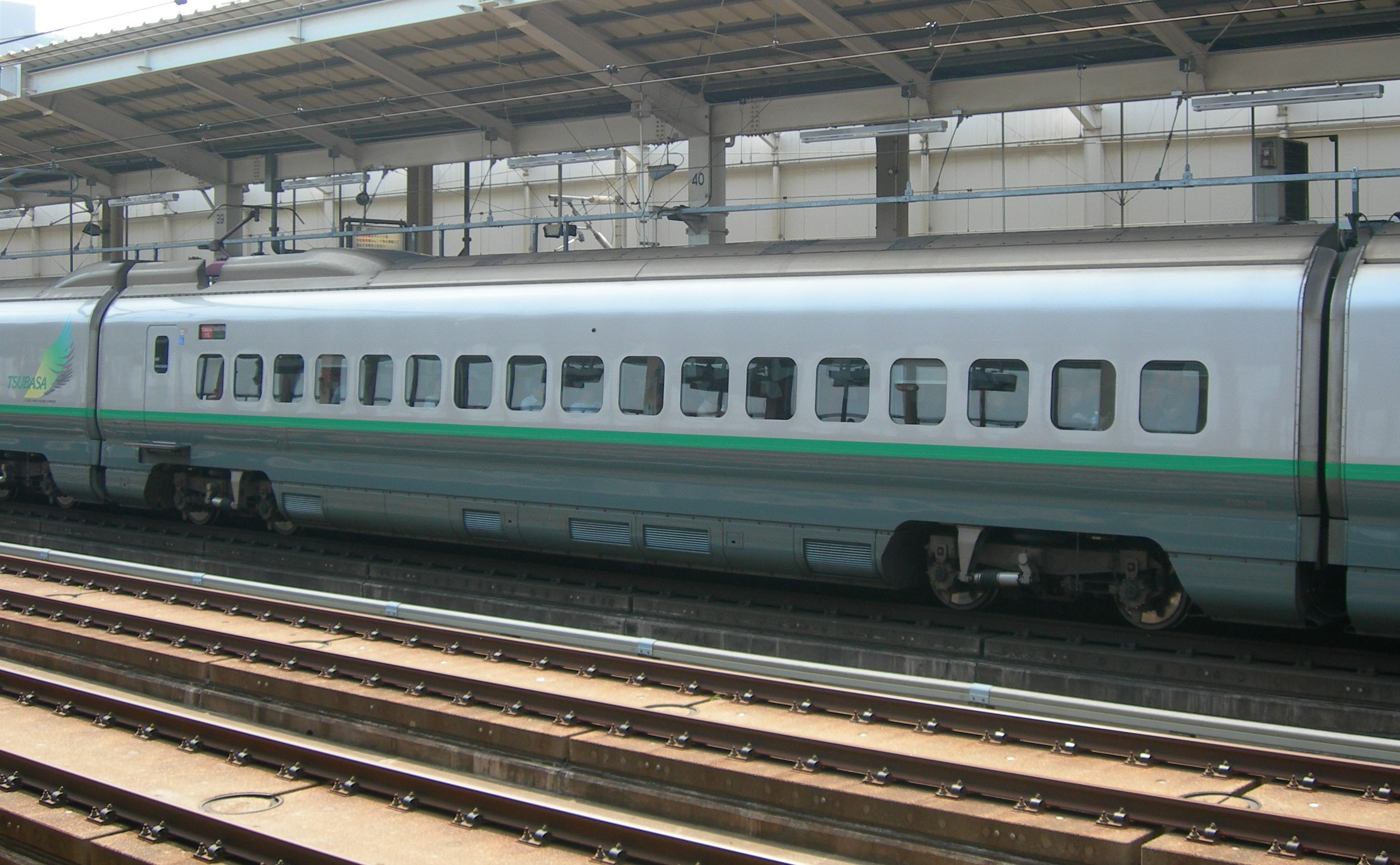
E326-2009 (car 12)

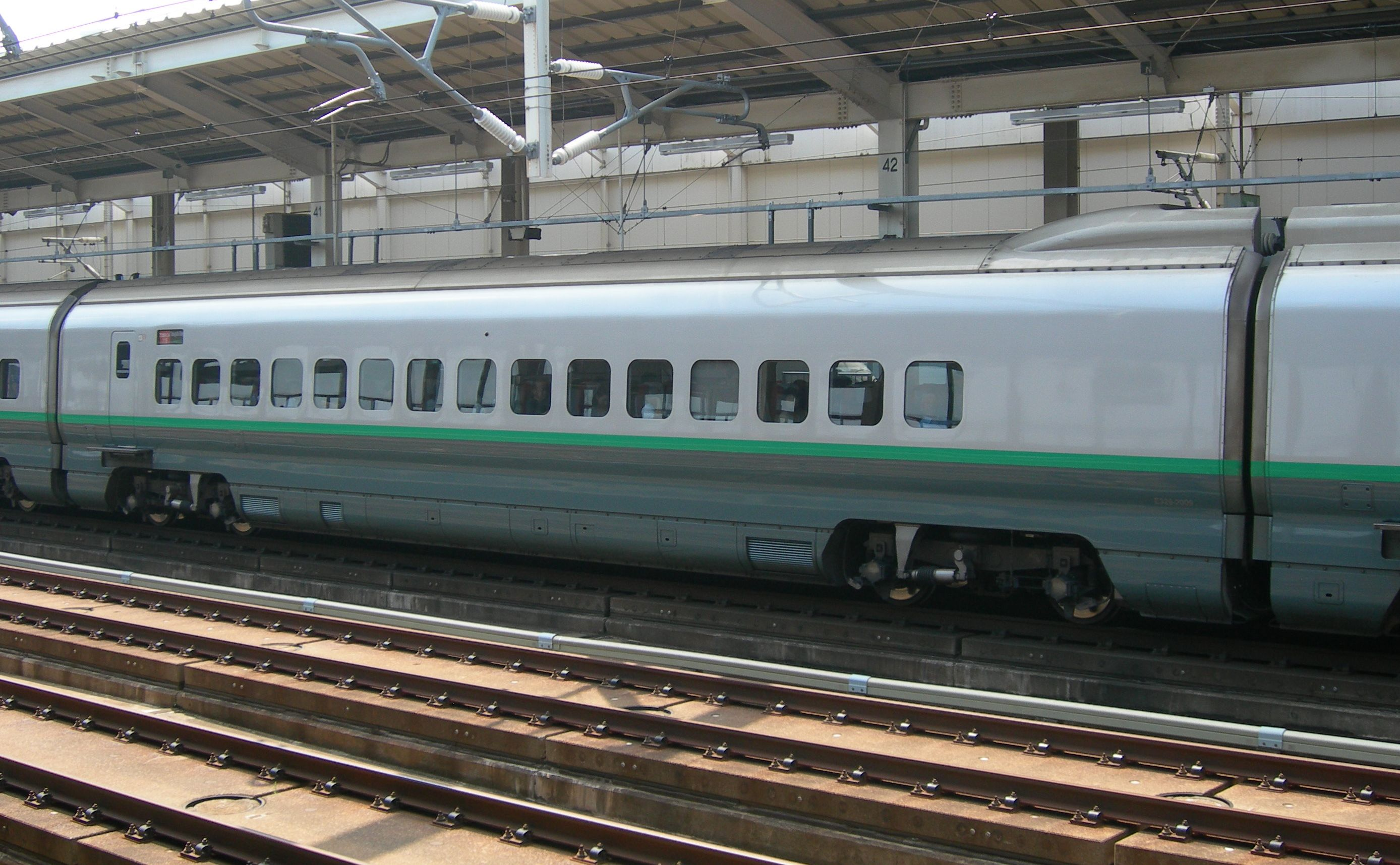
E329-2009 (car 13)

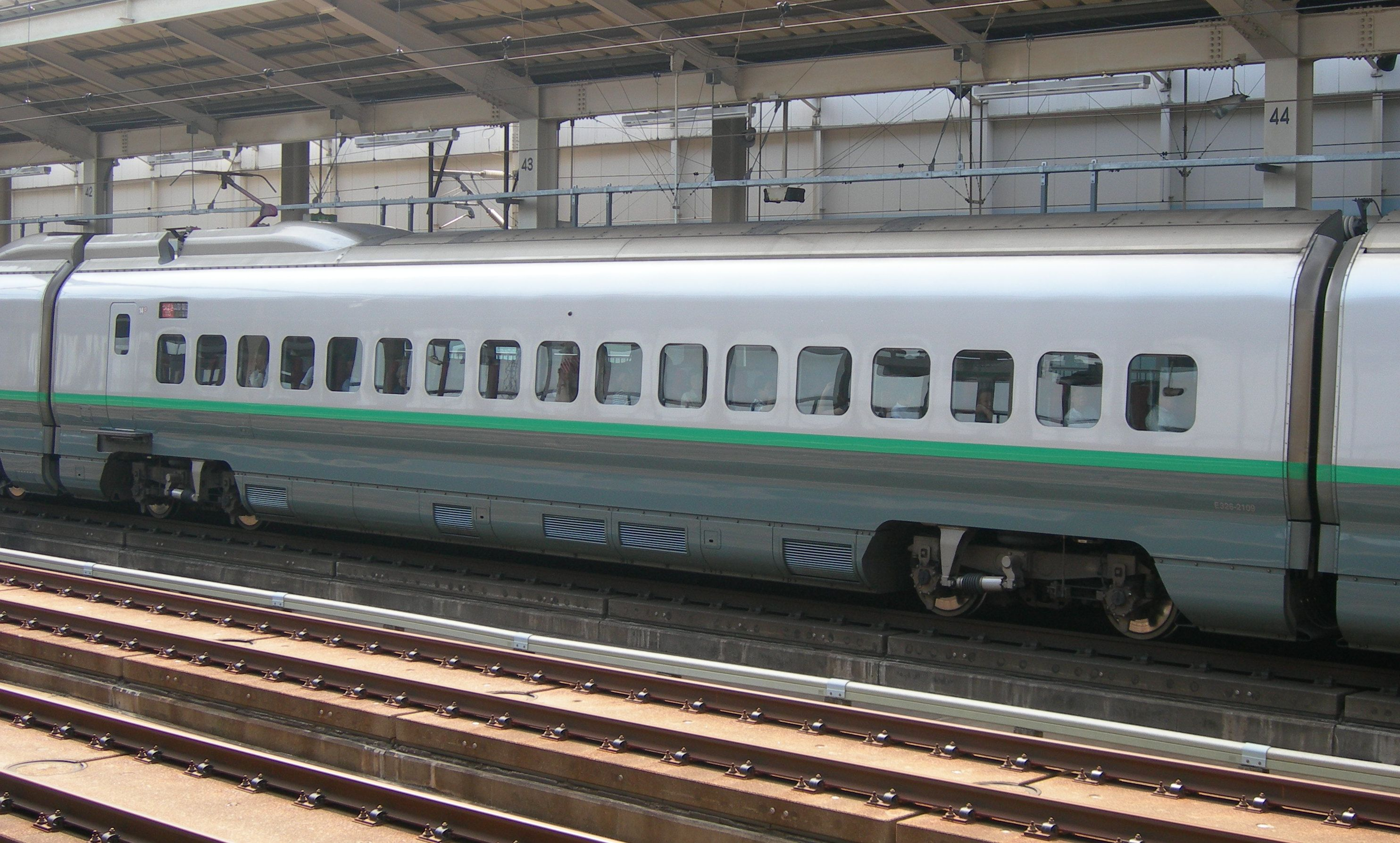
E326-2109 (car 14)

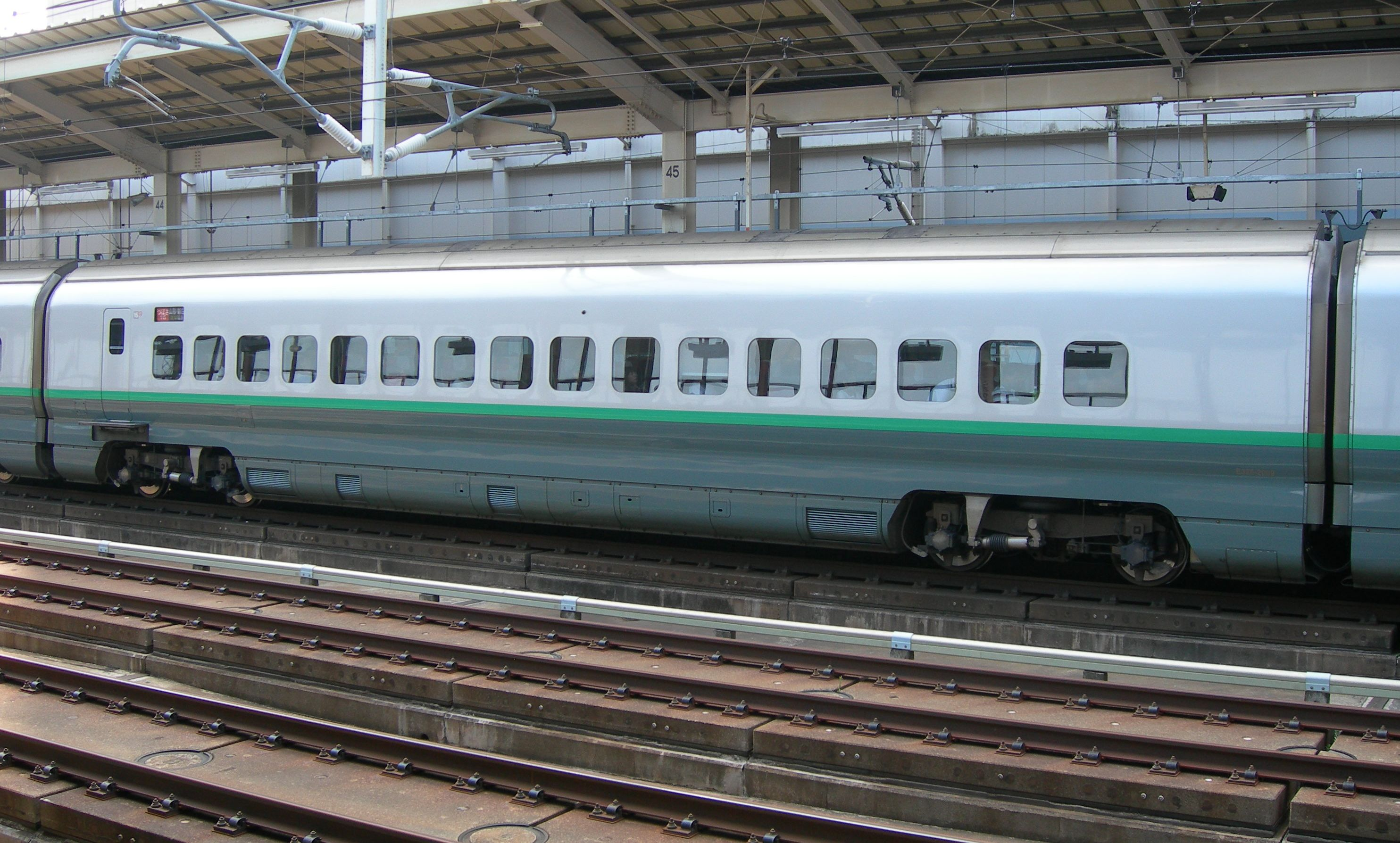
E328-2009 (car 15)

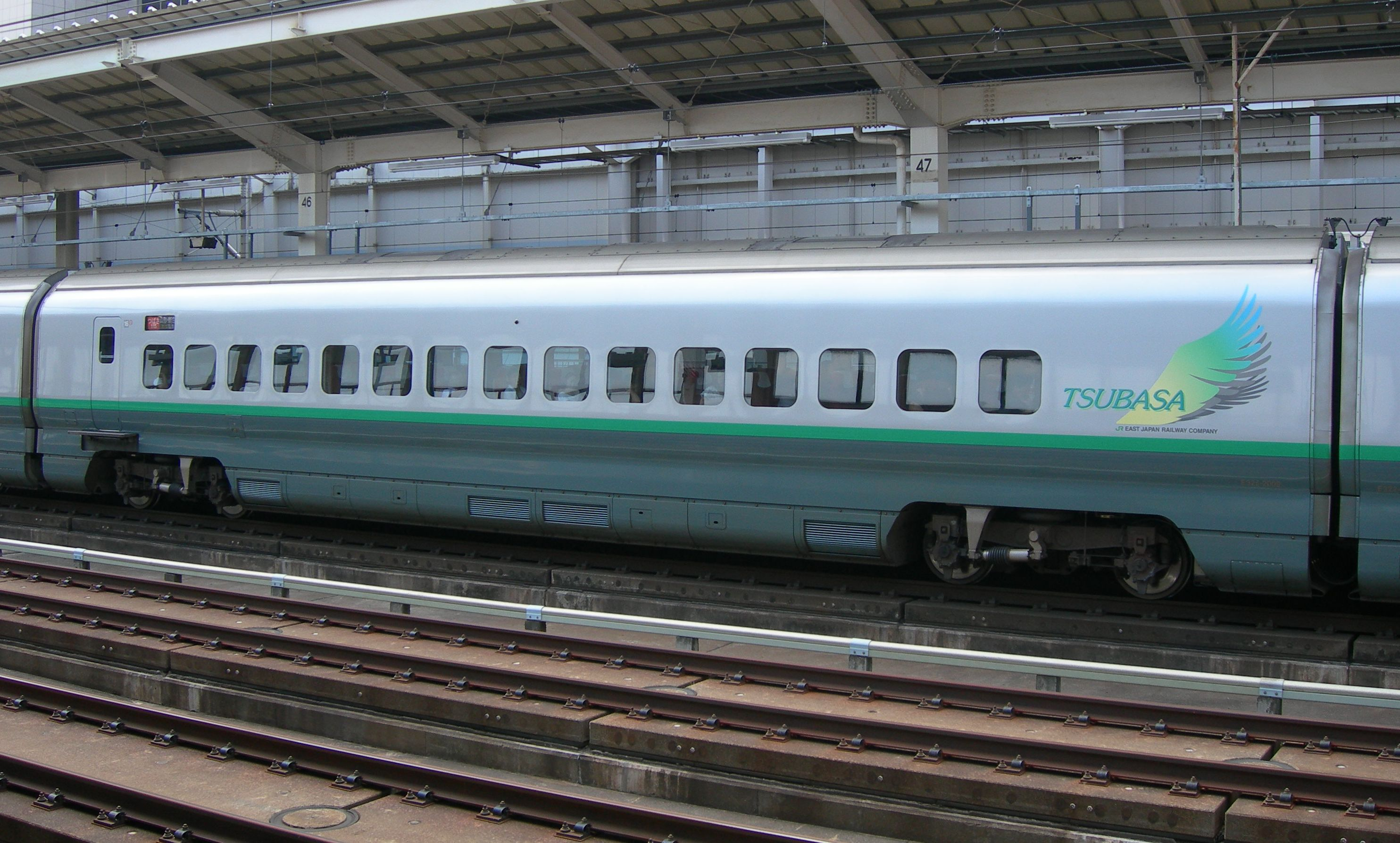
E325-2009 (car 16)

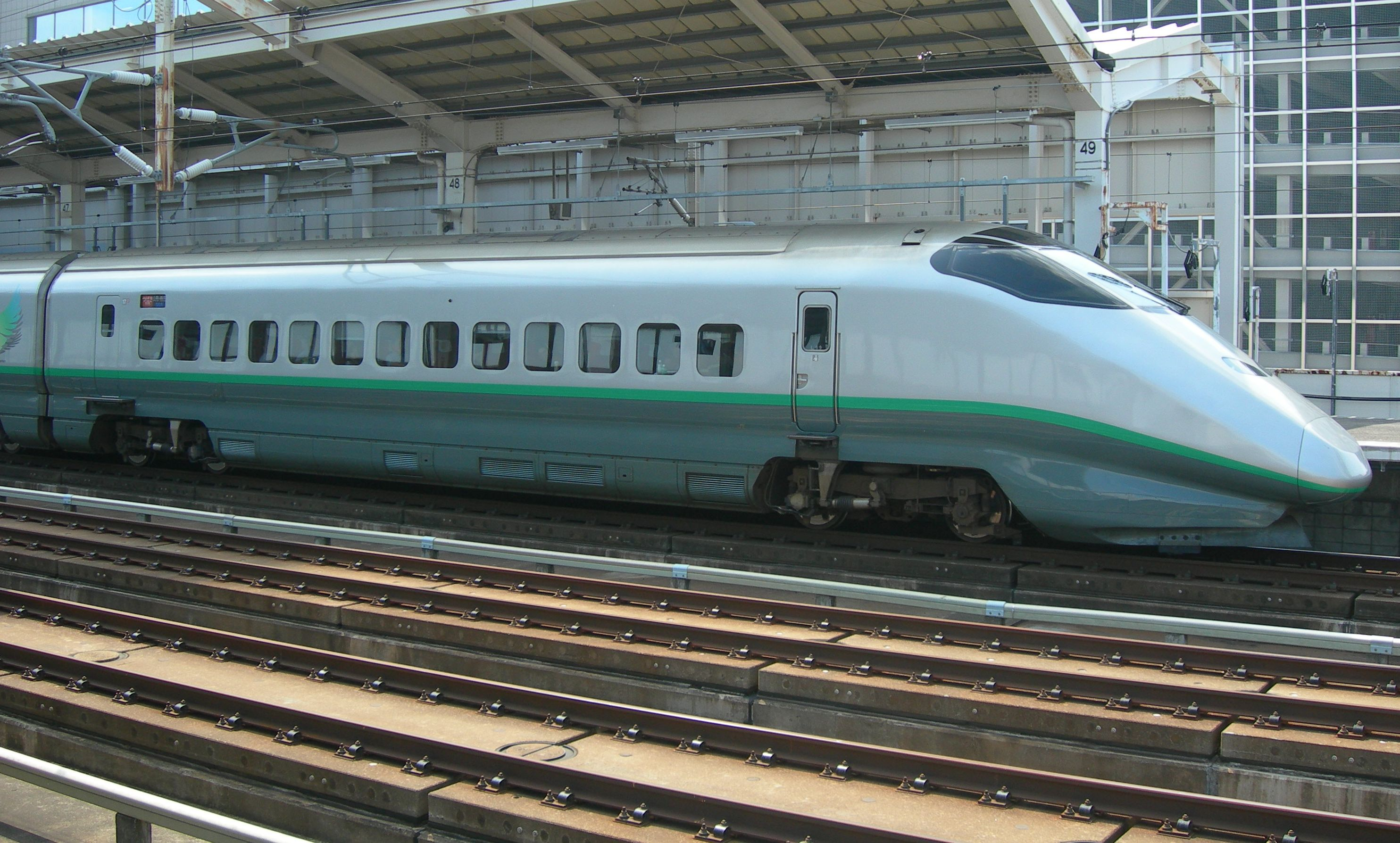
E322-2009 (car 17)

=== Fleet history ===
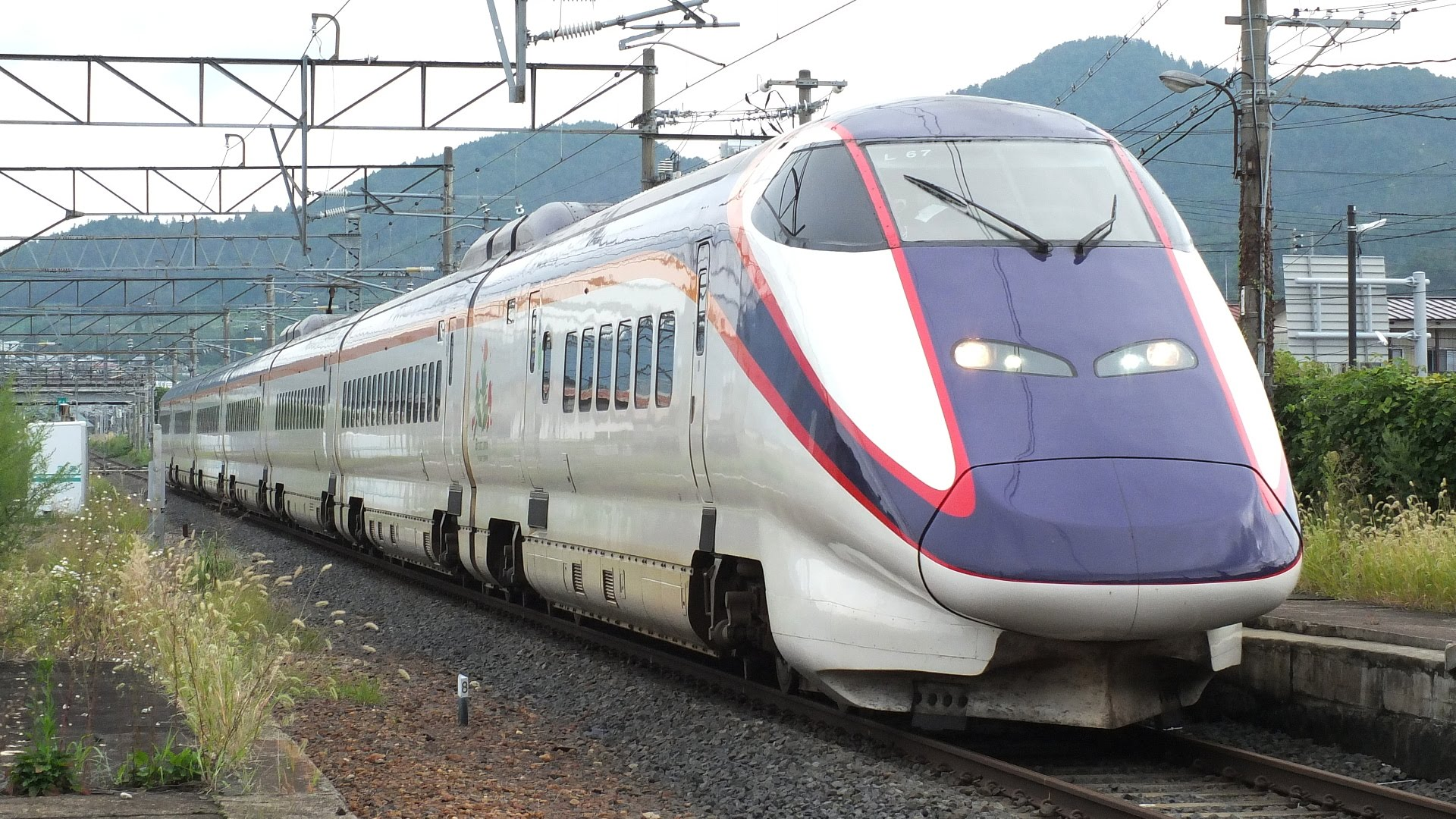
E3-2000 series set L67 in updated livery in September 2015

As of 1 October 2016, the E3-2000 series fleet is as follows.

Set	Manufacturer	Delivered	Repainted	Withdrawn	Notes
L61	Kawasaki	9 October 2008	6 July 2016	7 December 2024	
L62	Kawasaki	9 December 2008	Unknown	26 June 2025	
L63	Kawasaki	7 January 2009	24 November 2015	17 December 2024	
L64	Kawasaki	17 February 2009	25 April 2014	25 December 2024	
L65	Kawasaki	3 March 2009	6 June 2014 11 February 2023 (heritage unit)		
L66	Kawasaki	25 March 2009	22 October 2014	22 August 2024	
L67	Tokyu Car	28 March 2009	12 November 2014		
L68	Kawasaki	14 April 2009	5 December 2014		
L69	Kawasaki	19 May 2009	23 February 2015		Modified for use as a Cargo Shinkansen; commenced freight Hakobyun services on 23 March 2026
L70	Kawasaki	30 June 2009	6 April 2016	22 October 2025	
L71	Kawasaki	22 July 2009	24 April 2016	22 November 2025	
L72	Kawasaki	25 March 2010	18 September 2015		

=== Interior ===
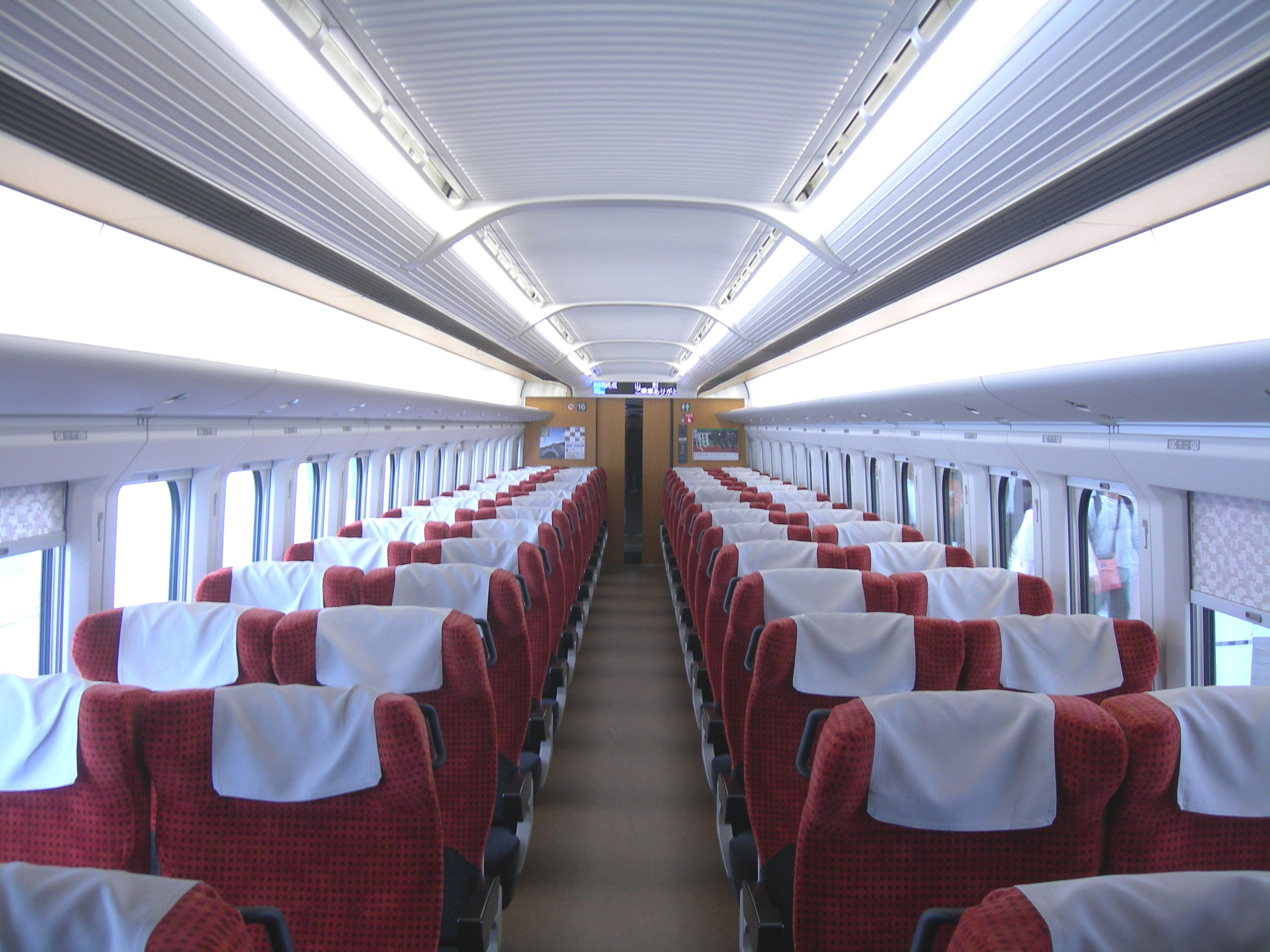
Standard class car interior

== Toreiyu excursion set ==
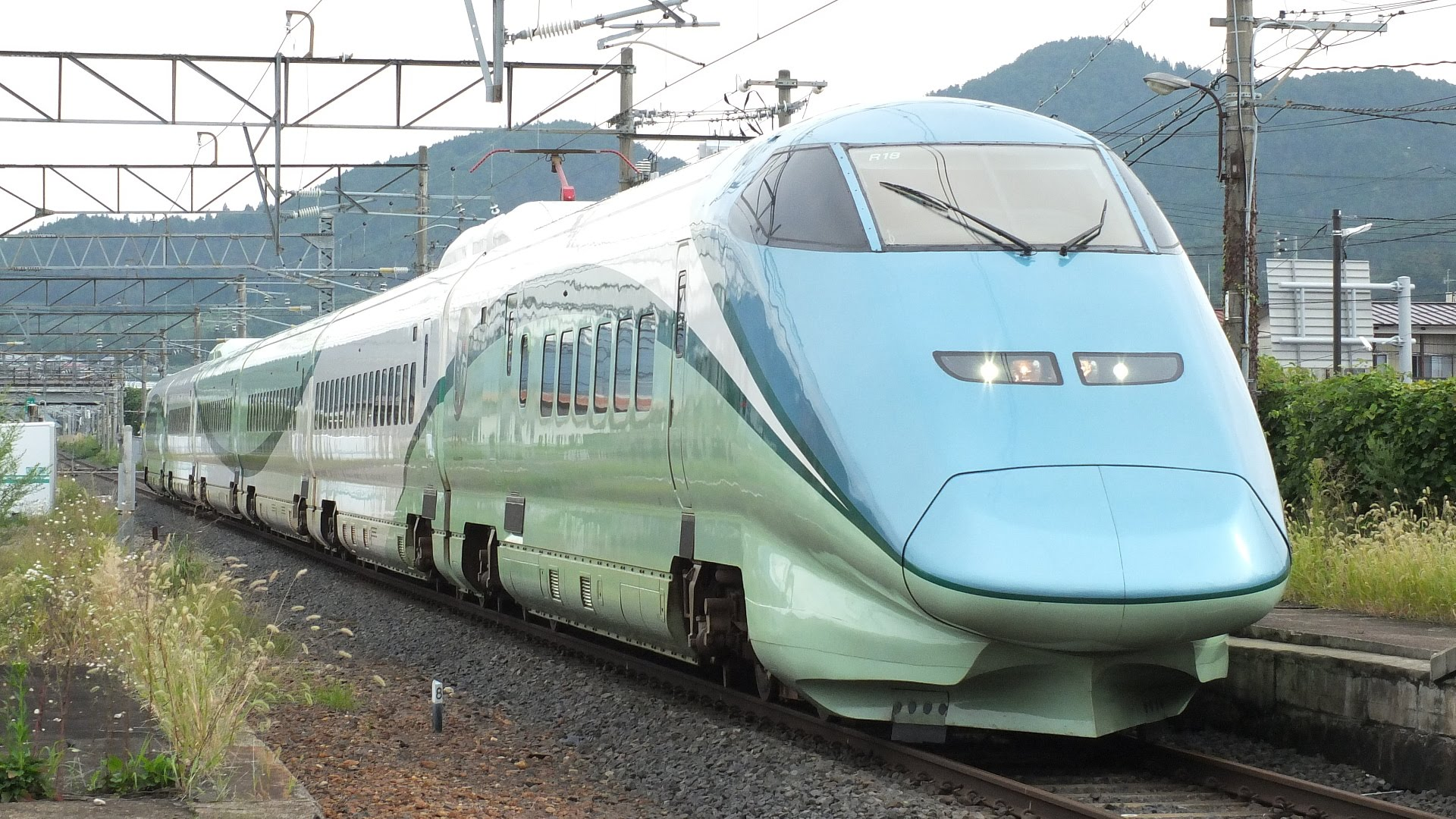
E3-700 series Toreiyu set R18 in September 2015

The E3-700 series Toreiyu (とれいゆ) excursion set was a six-car train rebuilt from former Akita Shinkansen trainset R18 for use on the Yamagata Shinkansen between Shinjō and Fukushima, entering service in July 2014. The rebuild and interior design were overseen by Ken Okuyama. Toreiyu is a portmanteau of the English word "train" and the French word soleil (“sun”), the set had a total seating capacity of 143 passengers.

Cars 12 to 14 featured Japanese-style tatami seating mats, car 11 was a reserved ordinary-class car with coventional 2+2 seating, car 15 served as a lounge with a bar counter, and car 16 was equipped with ashiyu foot baths. The train was normally operated on special Toreiyu Tsubasa services on weekends and was withdrawn from service in March 2022.

=== Formation ===
The Toreiyu set was based at Yamagata Depot and formed as shown below, with car 11 at the Fukushima end.

Car No.	11	12	13	14	15	16
Designation	M1c	M2	T1	T2	M1	M2c
Numbering	E321-701	E326-701	E329-701	E328-701	E325-701	E322-701
Facilities	2+2 seating	Japanese-style seating			Lounge + bar counter	Ashiyu foot baths

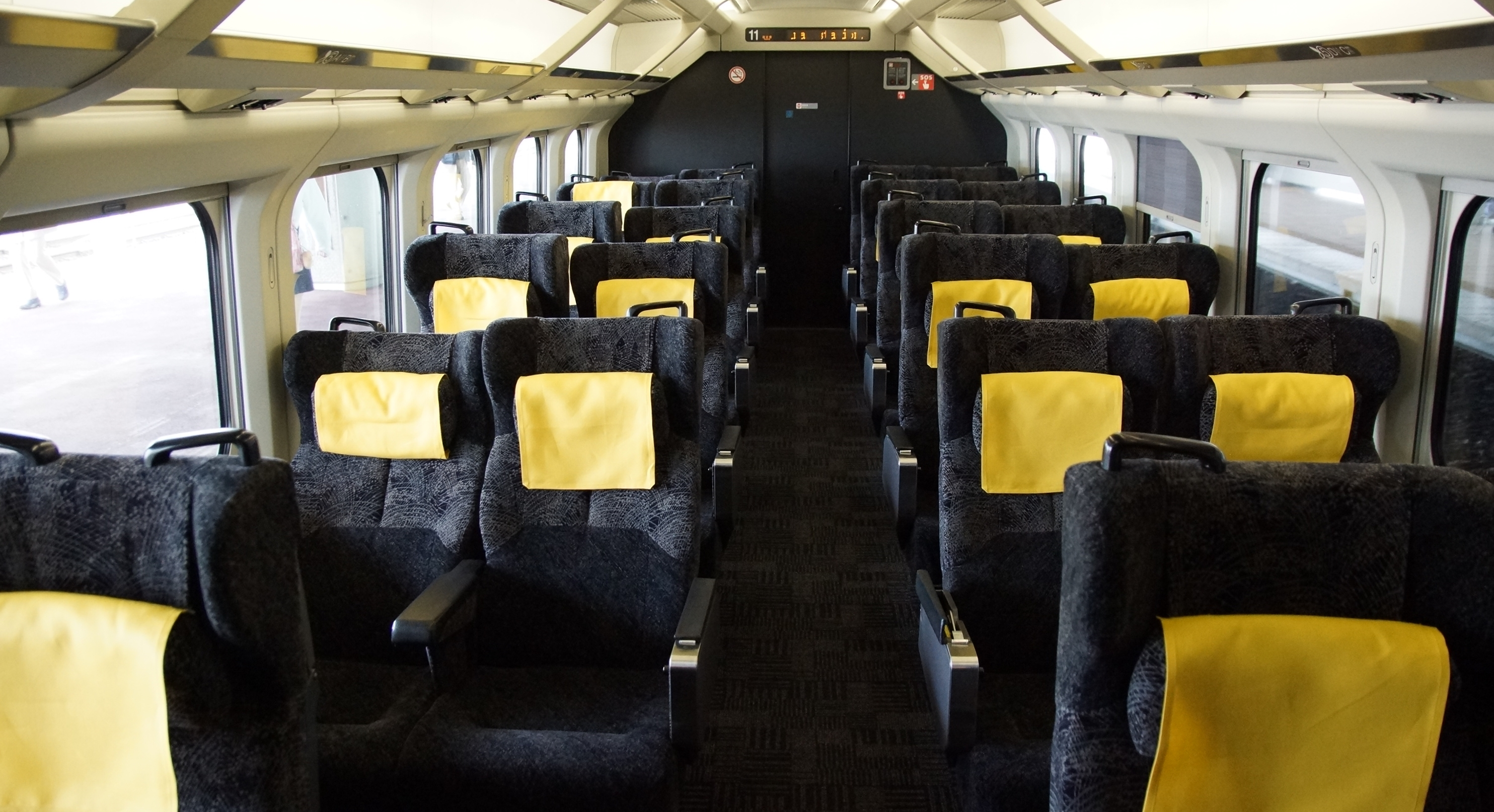
Interior of car 11 with conventional seating

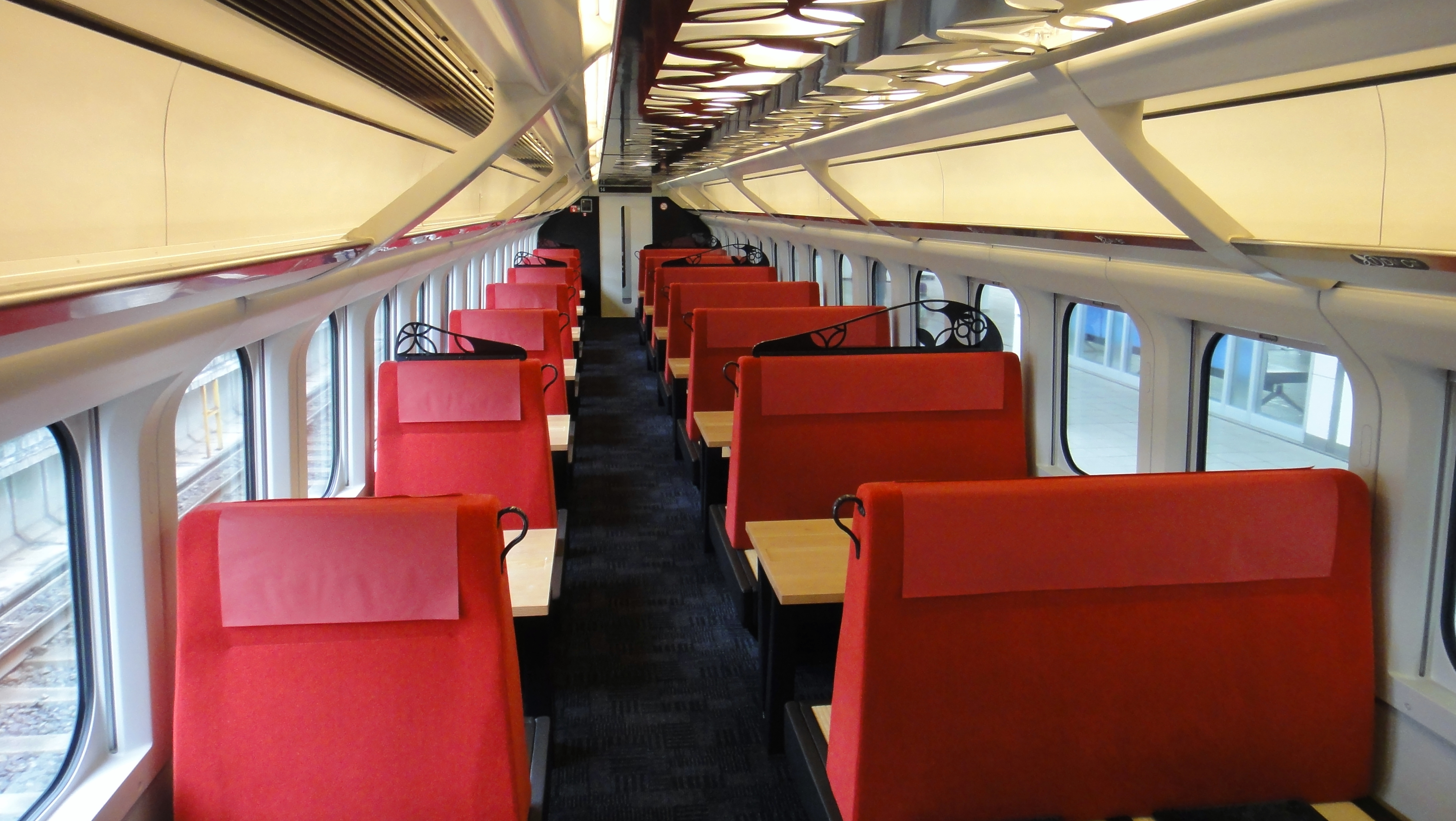
Interior of car 14 with Japanese-style tatami seating

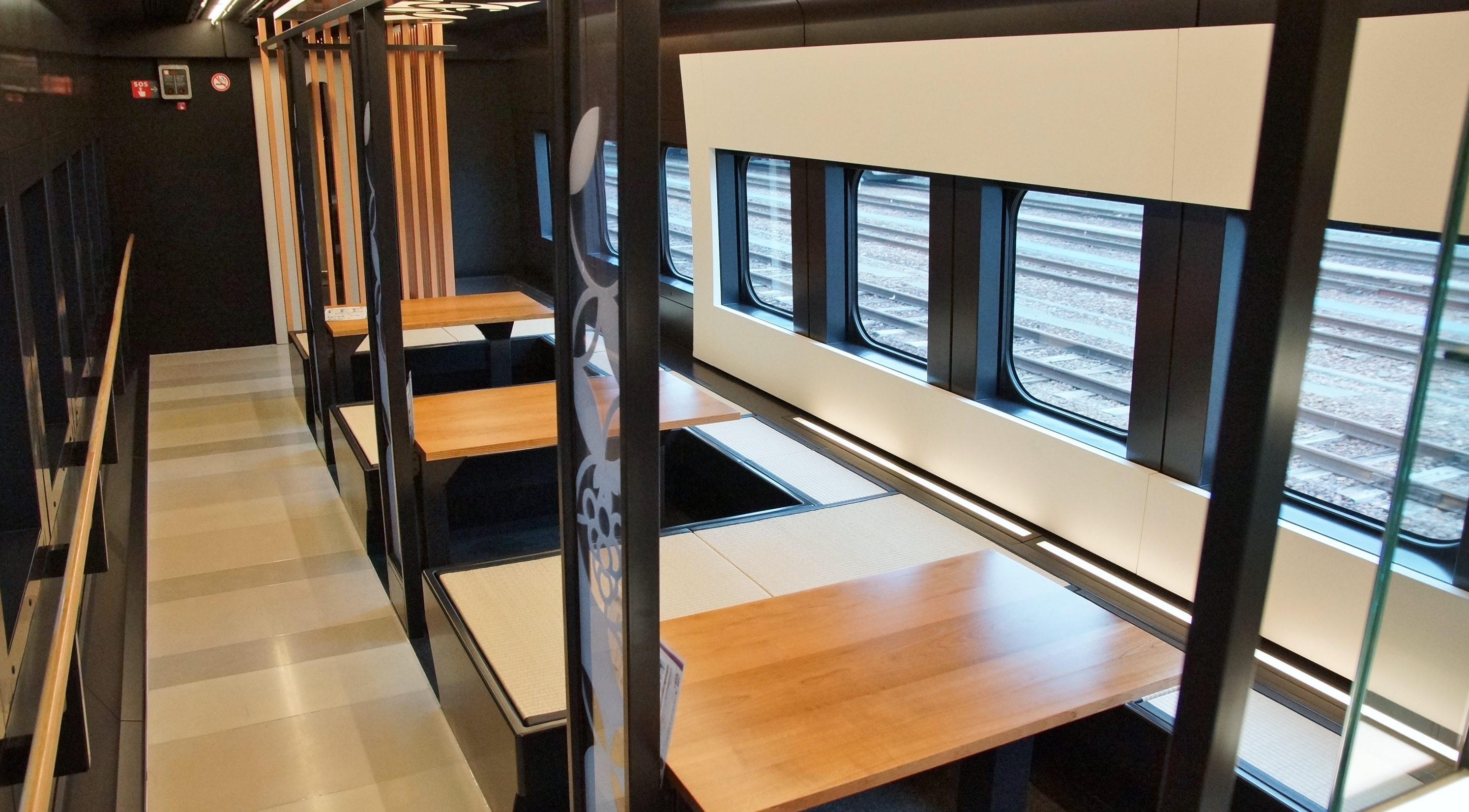
The tatami lounge area in car 15

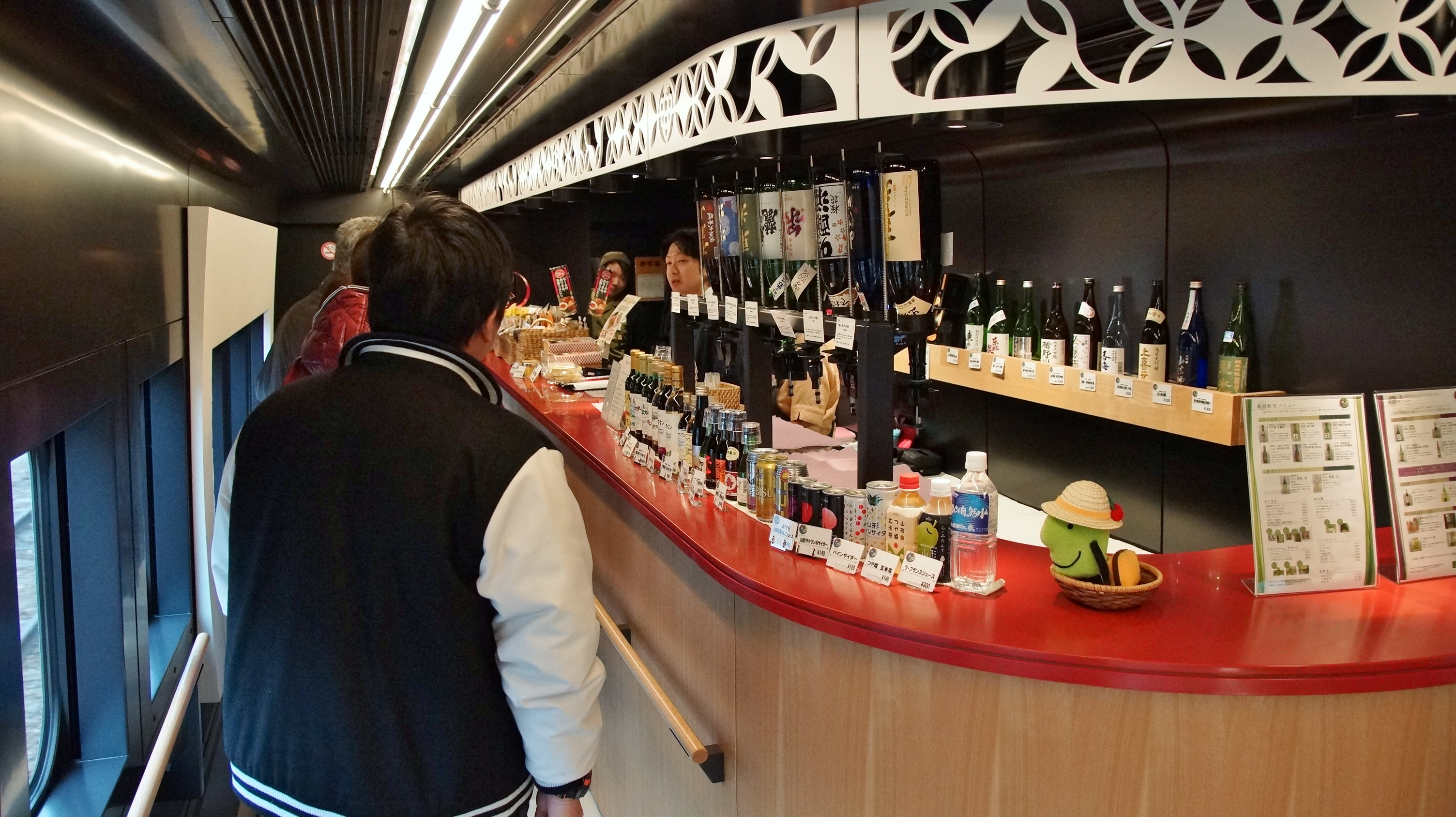
The bar counter in car 15

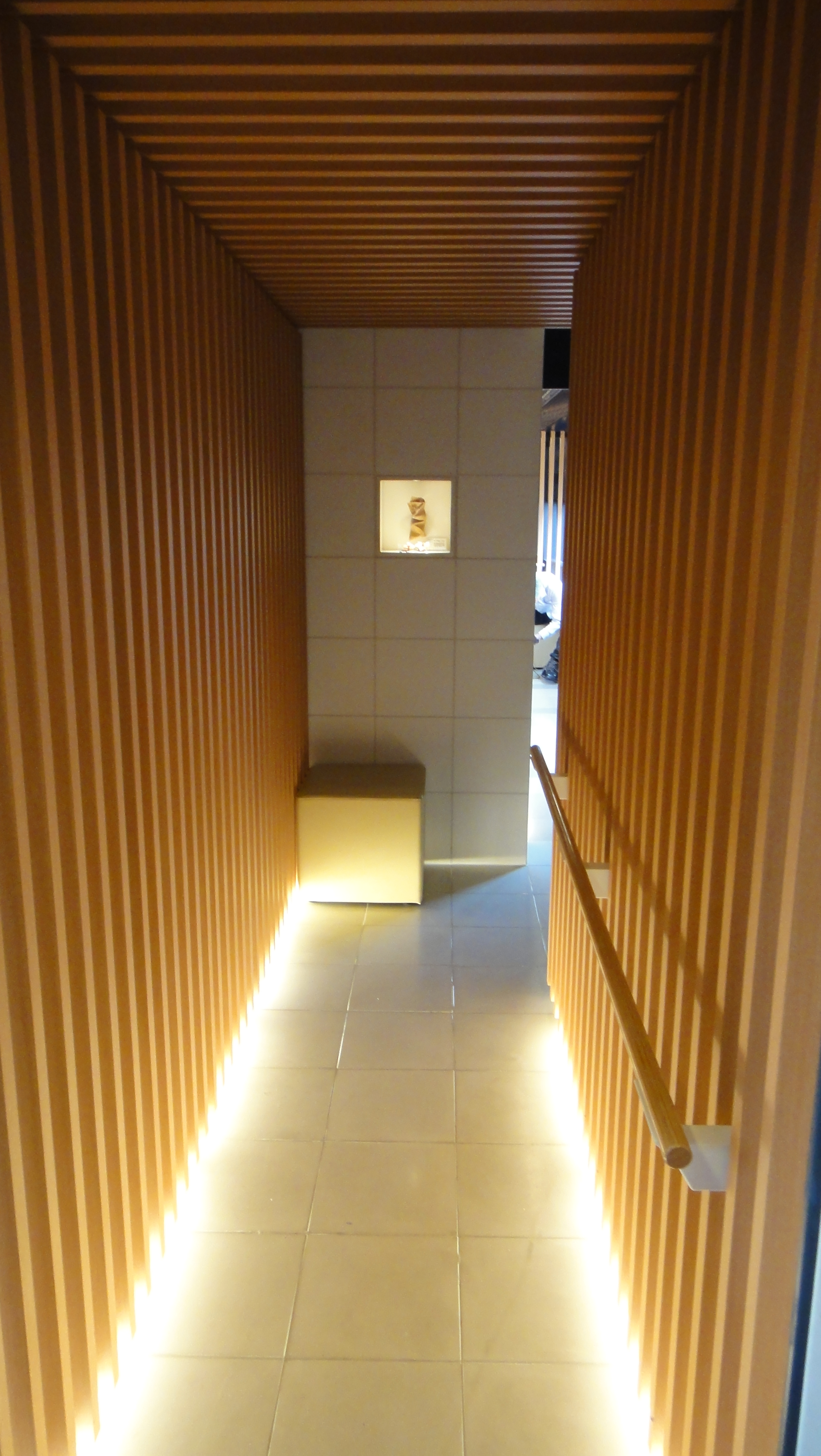
The entrance to car 16

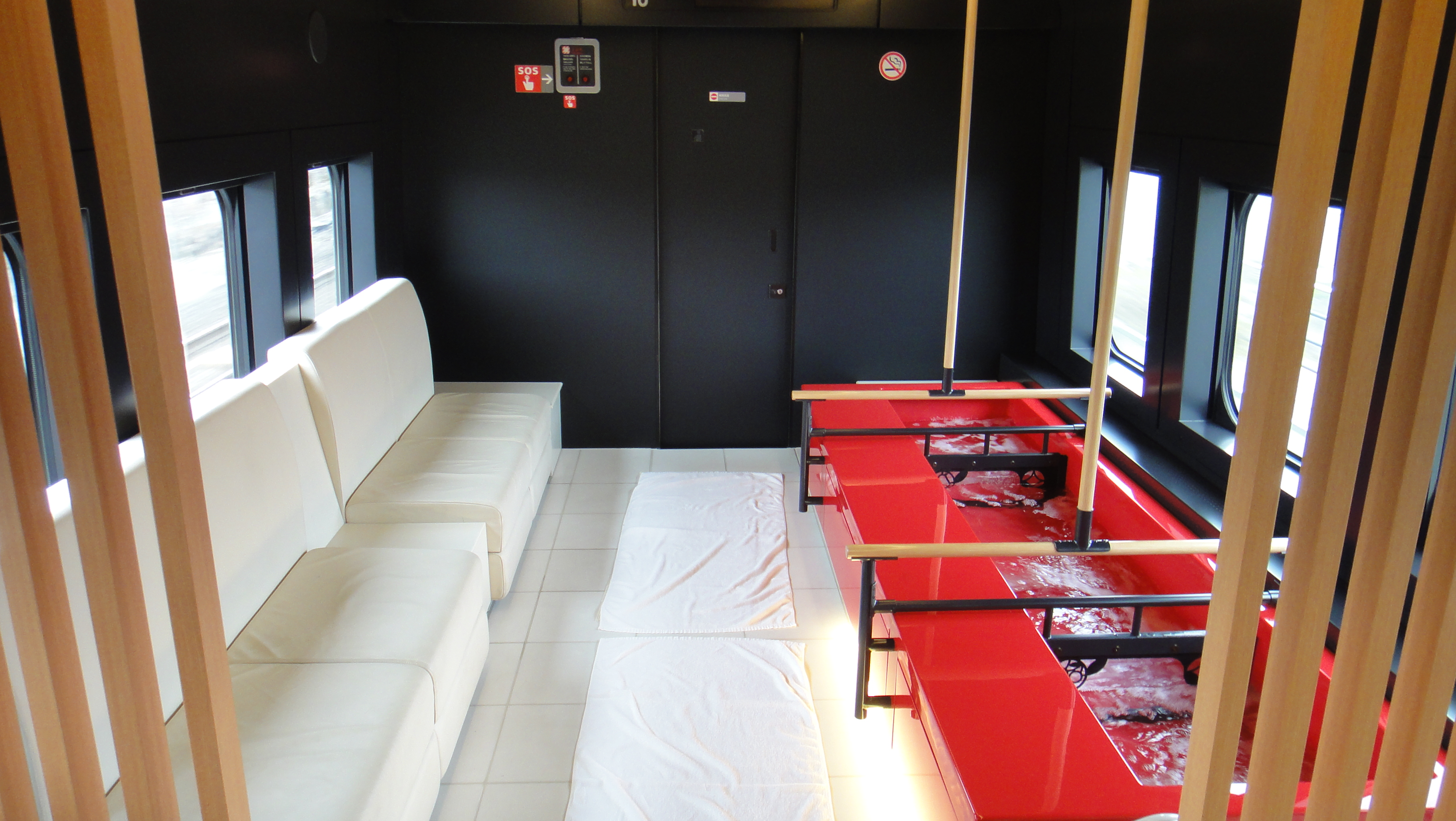
The ashiyu foot baths at the end of car 16

== Genbi Shinkansen excursion set ==
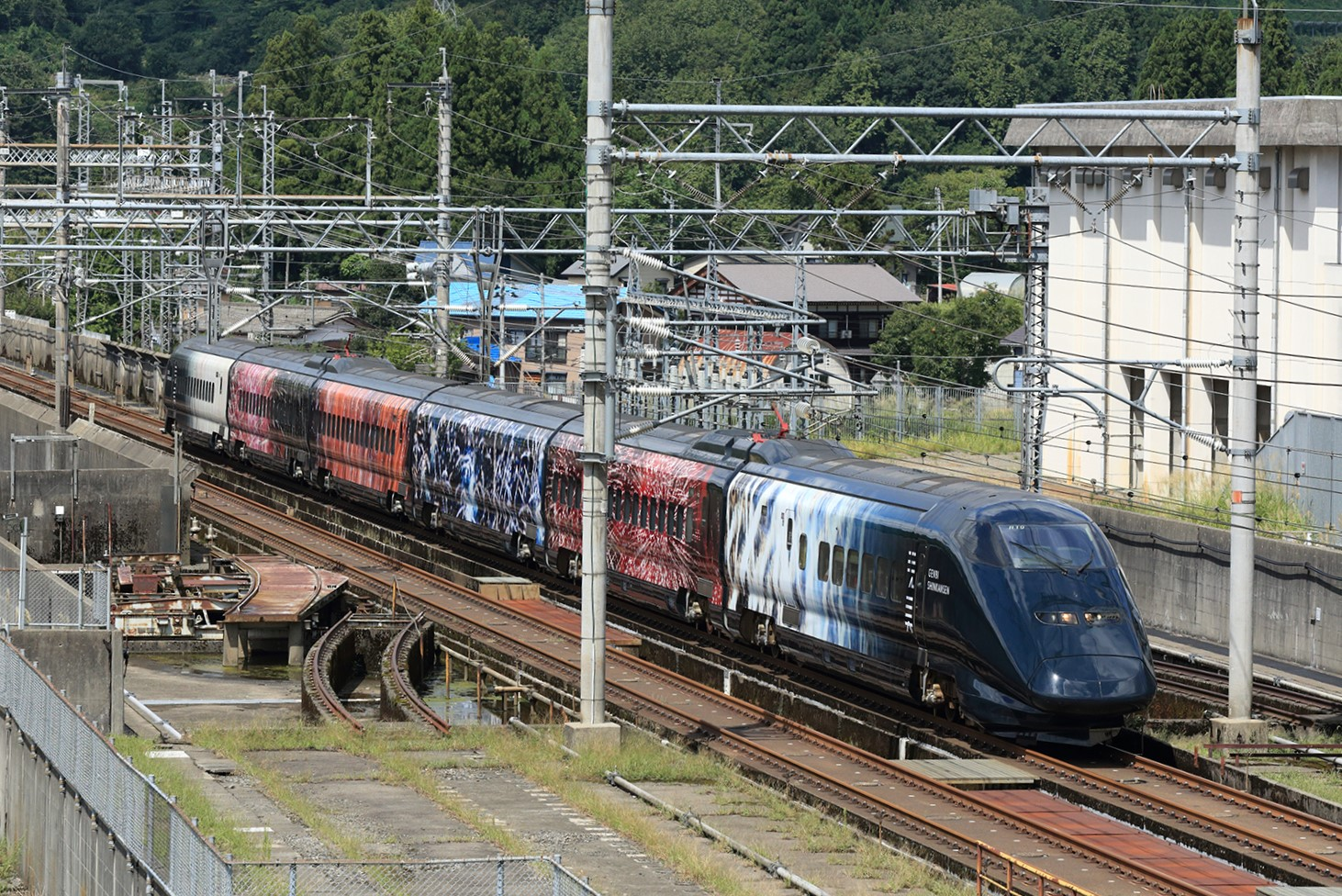
Genbi Shinkansen set in September 2016

E3-700 series Genbi Shinkansen (現美新幹線; lit. 'contemporary art Shinkansen') was a six-car excursion train rebuilt from former Akita Shinkansen trainset R19 at Kawasaki Heavy Industries in Kobe for operation on the Jōetsu Shinkansen between Echigo-Yuzawa and Niigata.

The exterior livery was designed by photographer Mika Ninagawa. Each car featured artwork by a different artist: car 11 had 2+2 seating and showcased a golden-yellow installation by Nao Matsumoto inspired by harvests, festivals, and light, with window shades using special dyes that reacted to changes in light when passing through tunnels; car 12 featured mirrored walls by Yusuke Komuta that reflected the surrounding scenery; car 13 combined a children’s play area designed by Art Unit Paramodel, featuring blue-and-white toy train motifs, with a café designed by Kentaro Kobuke serving sweets made with local ingredients; car 14 displayed an alpine photography exhibition by Naoki Ishikawa; car 15 featured an abstract floral artwork by Haruka Koujin designed to vibrate with the motion of the train; and car 16 screened a short film by Brian Alfred depicting the landscapes of Niigata Prefecture.

The completed trainset was unveiled to the media on 12 January 2016 and entered service on 29 April 2016, operating primarily on weekends and holidays, and was withdrawn on 19 December 2020.

=== Formation ===
The Genbi Shinkansen set was based at Niigata Depot and formed as shown below, with car 11 at the Tokyo end.

Car No.	11	12	13	14	15	16
Designation	M1c	M2	T1	T2	M1	M2c
Numbering	E321-702	E326-702	E329-702	E328-702	E325-702	E322-702
Former number	E311-19	E326-19	E329-19	E328-19	E325-19	E322-19
Facilities	2+2 seating	Art gallery spaces	Cafe + children's play area	Art gallery spaces		

Cars 12 and 15 each had one single-arm pantograph.

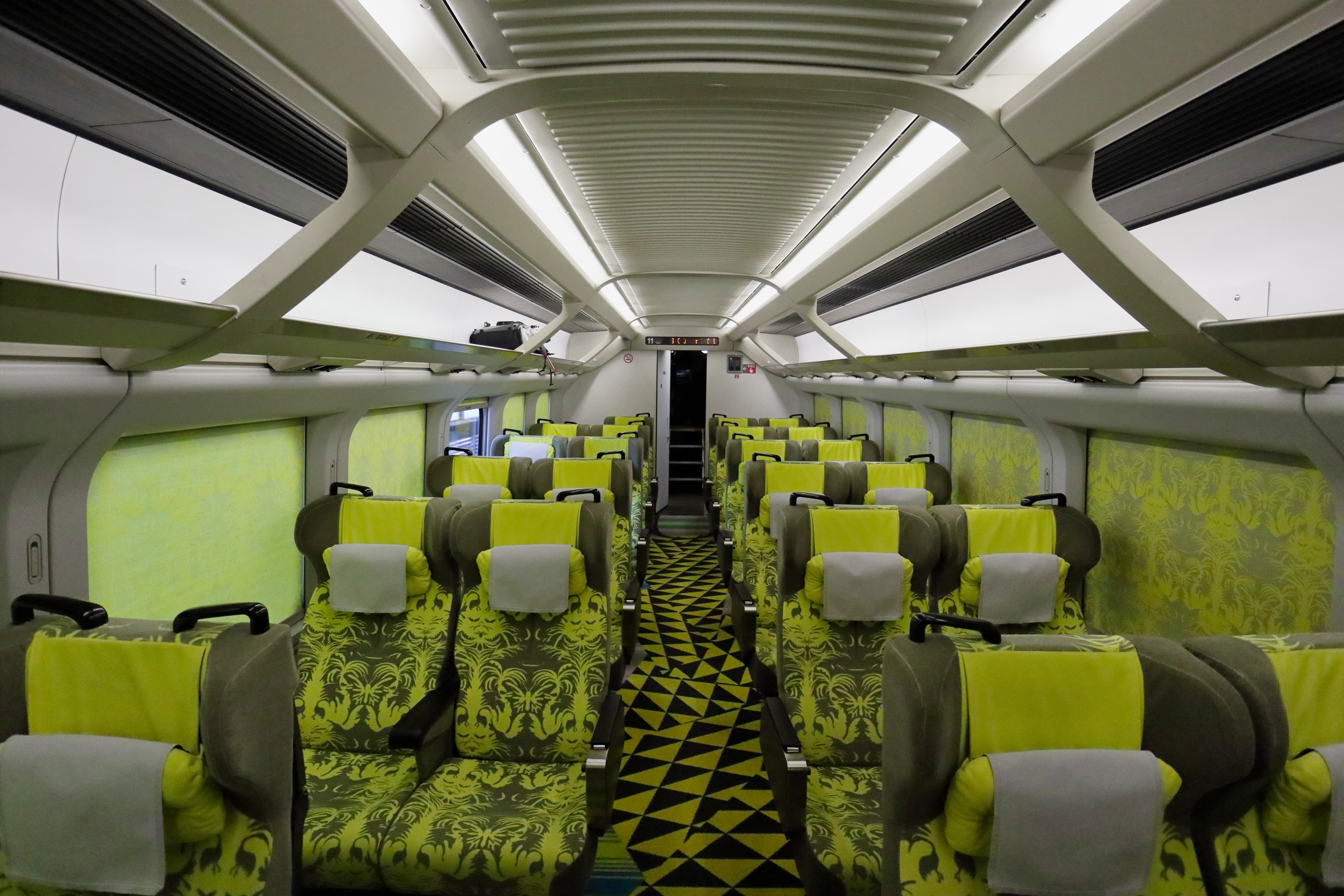
Ordinary seating in car 11 designed by Nao Matsumoto

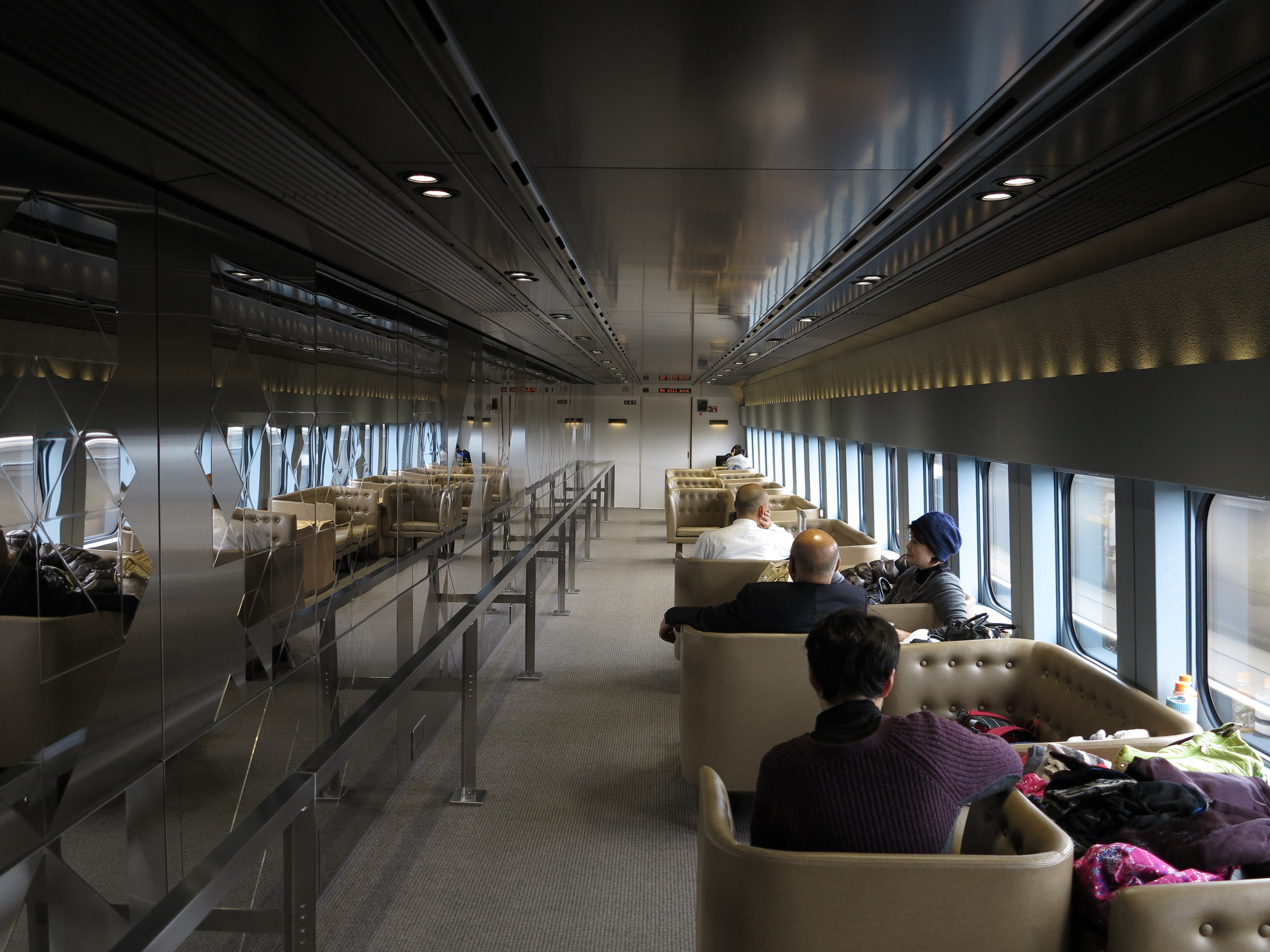
Car 12 interior with mirror installation by Yusuke Komuta

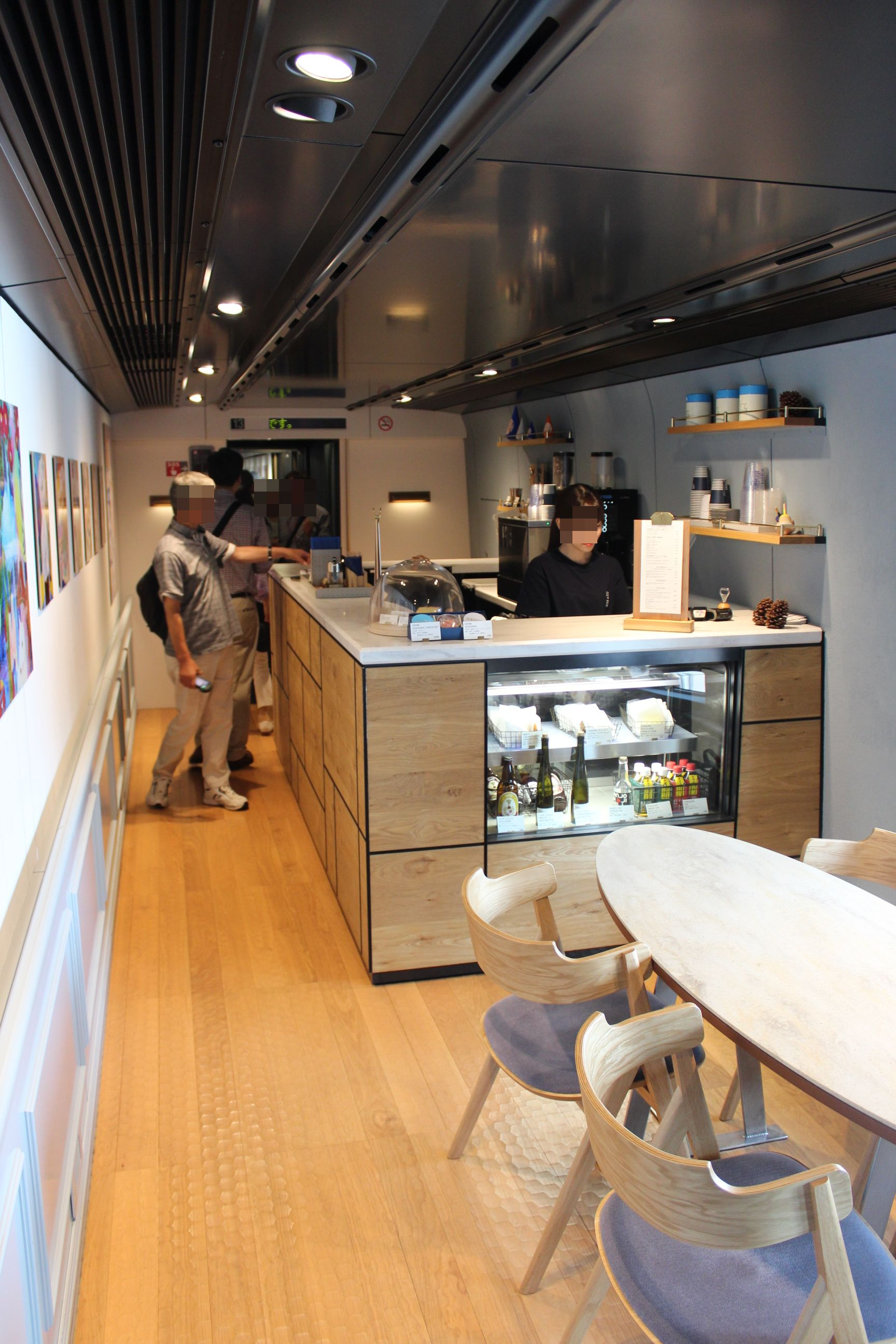
Cafe counter in Car 13 designed by Kentaro Kobuke

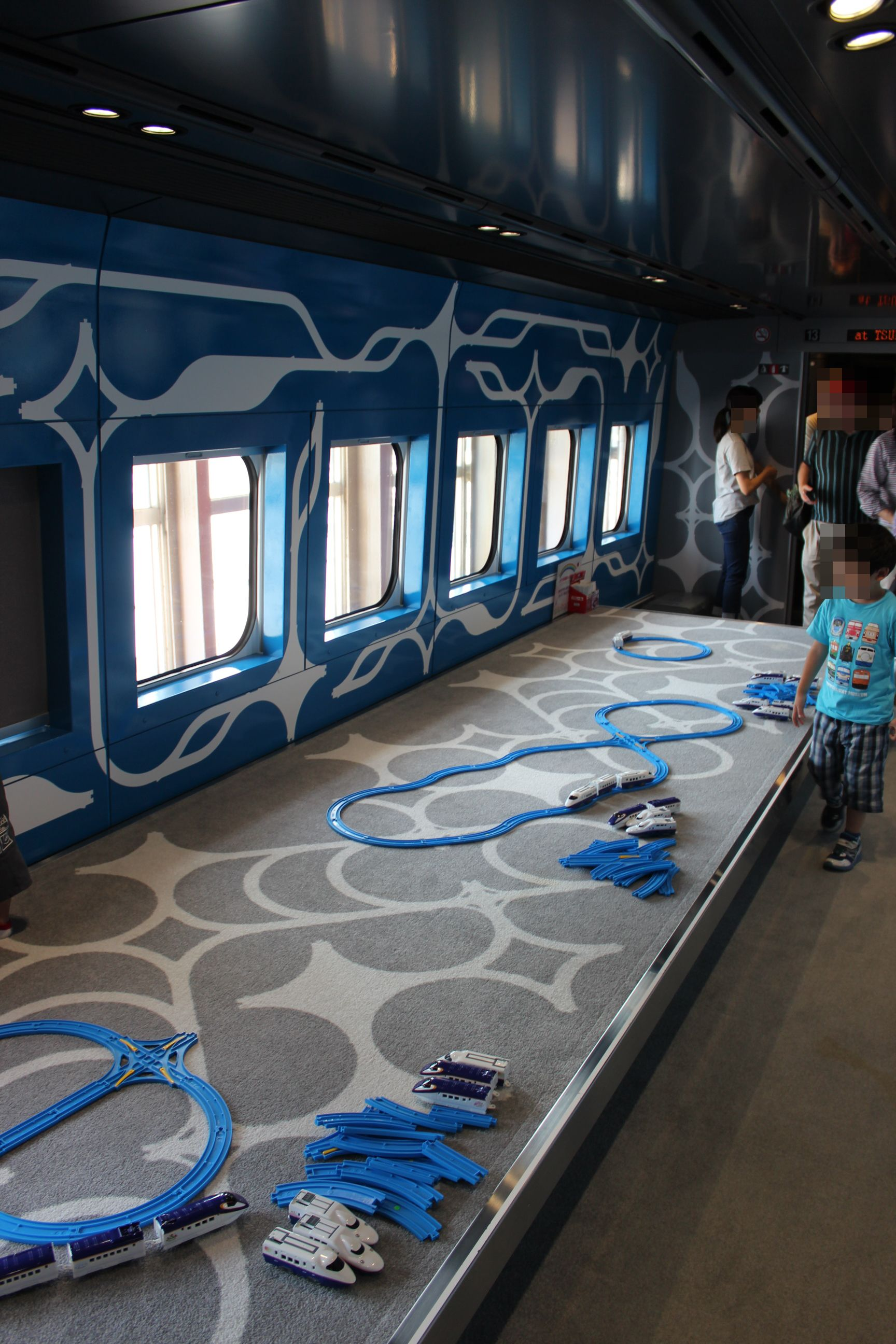
The children's play area in car 13 designed by Art Unit Paramodel

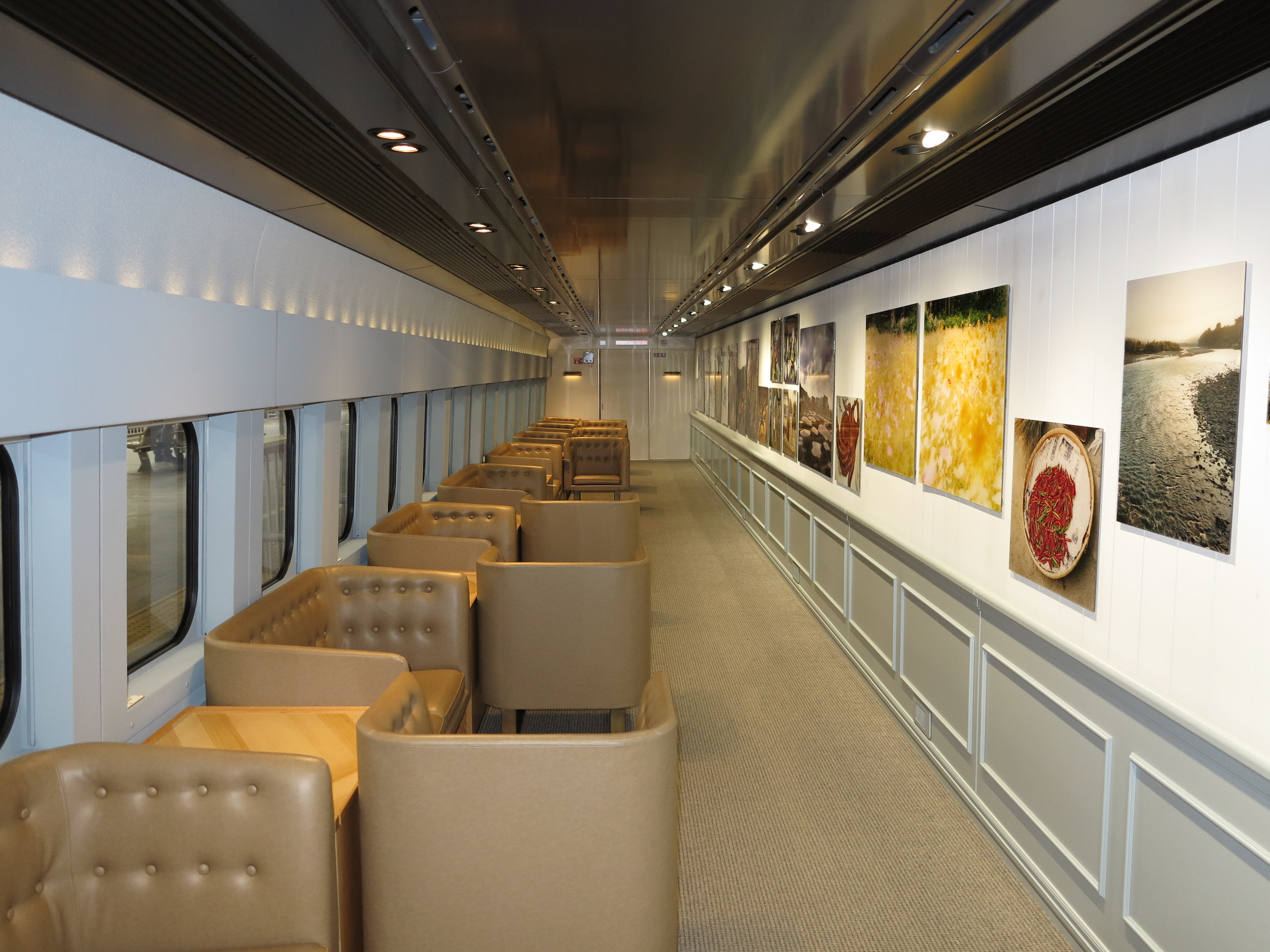
Car 14 interior with photographs by Naoki Ishikawa

== Derivatives ==
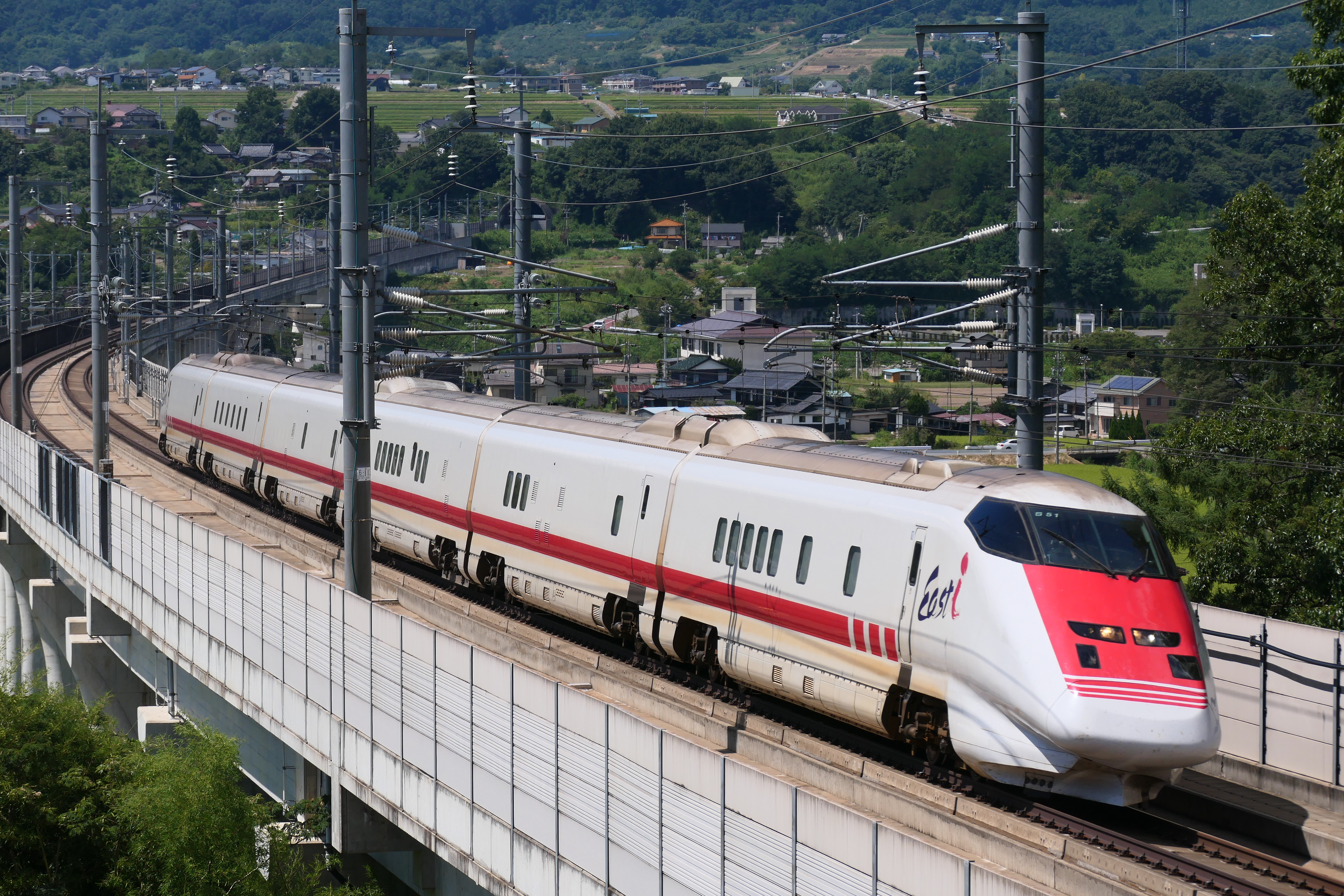
Class E926 "East-i" train

=== East-i inspection train ===
The Class E926 Shinkansen, also known as the "East-i", is an inspection train based on the E3 used for track and overhead wire diagnostic work on the Tōhoku, Jōetsu, Hokuriku, Hokkaido, Yamagata, and Akita Shinkansen lines.

=== Cargo Shinkansen ===
E3-2000 set L69 after being modified for Cargo Shinkansen operations, coupled to an E5 Series operating a Yamabiko service

JR East is currently modifying E3 trainsets from the E3-2000 series after withdrawing them from regular Tsubasa services on the Yamagata Shinkansen for freight-only services by removing passenger seating and adding equipment to secure cargo. It would be capable of transporting about 1,000 containers of goods and has a maximum loading capacity of 17.4 tonnes (38,000 lb). The modified trainsets will be transporting high-value goods including seafood, pharmaceuticals, and precision instruments between Morioka and Tokyo, coupling to E5/H5 Series Shinkansen operating Yamabiko services for its journey on weekday only services. The first service with an E3 modified for freight services commenced on 23 March 2026 with set L69.

=== Indian inspection train ===
One used E3 Series trainset is planned to be gifted to India (alongside an E5 Series trainset) for use as an inspection train on the Mumbai–Ahmedabad high-speed rail corridor, after modifications are carried out to install relevant equipment. This follows the precedent of a 0 Series being provided to Taiwan to serve as a structure gauging car during construction of the Taiwan High Speed Rail. Besides inspecting the tracks and overhead lines, it is expected that the trains will be used to collect data on performance in India's hot climate and dusty environment, and help inform development of the E10 Series for Indian service.

== See also ==
- List of high-speed trains
