= Tendo-ryu =

Tendo-ryu may refer to:

- Tendo-ryu bujutsu, a bujutsu koryu specializing in the use of the naginata
- Tendo-ryu Aikido, an aikido style founded by Kenji Shimizu
- The style of "Anything-Goes Martial Arts", practiced by the Tendo family in the anime/manga series Ranma ½

== See also ==
- Tendō (disambiguation)
- Ryu (disambiguation)
