= Murayama Station (Yamagata) =

Railway station in Murayama, Yamagata Prefecture, Japan

Murayama Station 村山駅
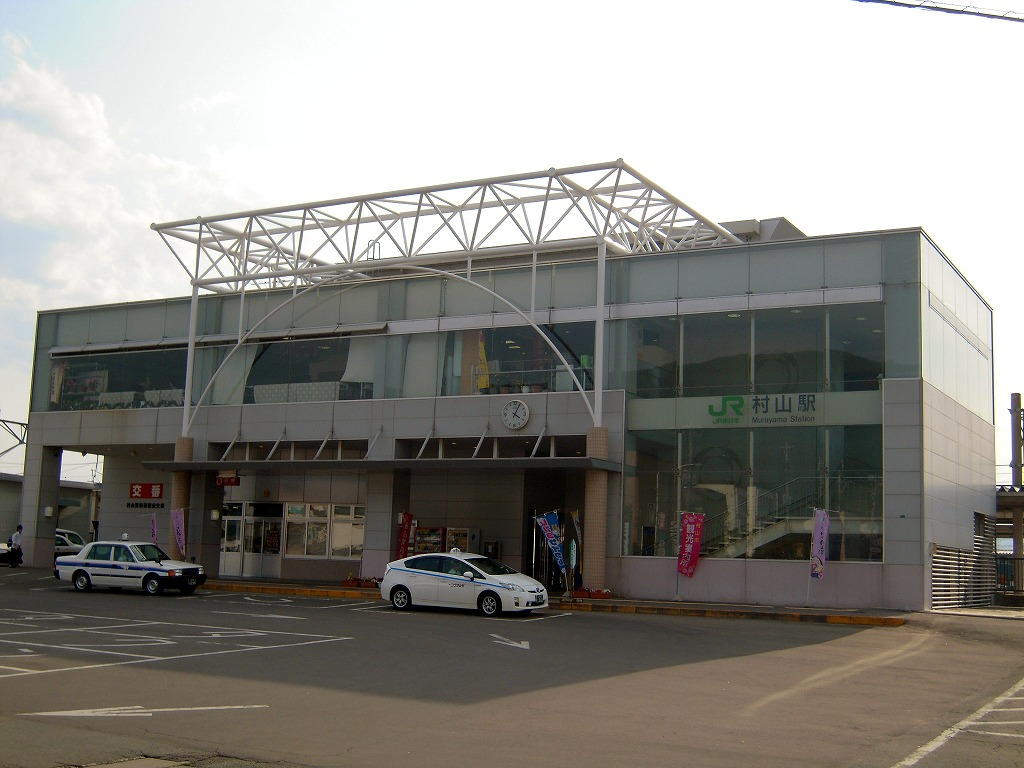
- East entrance of Murayama Station in May 2011

General information
- Location: 1 Tateoka-shimmachi, Murayama-shi, Yamagata-ken 995-0033; Japan
- Coordinates: 38°28′24″N 140°23′11″E
- Operator: JR East
- Lines: Yamagata Shinkansen; Ōu Main Line
- Distance: 113.5 km (70.5 mi) from Fukushima
- Platforms: 1 side + 1 island platform
- Tracks: 3

Construction
- Structure type: At grade

Other information
- Status: Staffed (Midori no Madoguchi)

History
- Opened: 23 August 1901; 125 years ago
- Former names: Tateoka (until 1999)

Passengers
- FY2018: 1,008 daily

Services
Preceding station	JR East	Following station
Sakurambo-Higashine towards Tokyo	Yamagata Shinkansen Tsubasa	Ōishida towards Shinjō
Higashine towards Fukushima	Yamagata Line	Sodesaki towards Shinjō
Location
- Location within Yamagata Prefecture Location within Japan

Murayama Station (村山駅, Murayama-eki) is a railway station in the city of Murayama, Yamagata, Japan, operated by East Japan Railway Company (JR East).

== Lines ==
Murayama Station is served by the Ōu Main Line and the Yamagata Shinkansen, with direct high-speed Tsubasa services to and from Tokyo. It is located 113.5 rail kilometers from the terminus of both lines at Fukushima Station and 386.3 kilometers from Tokyo Station.

== Station layout ==
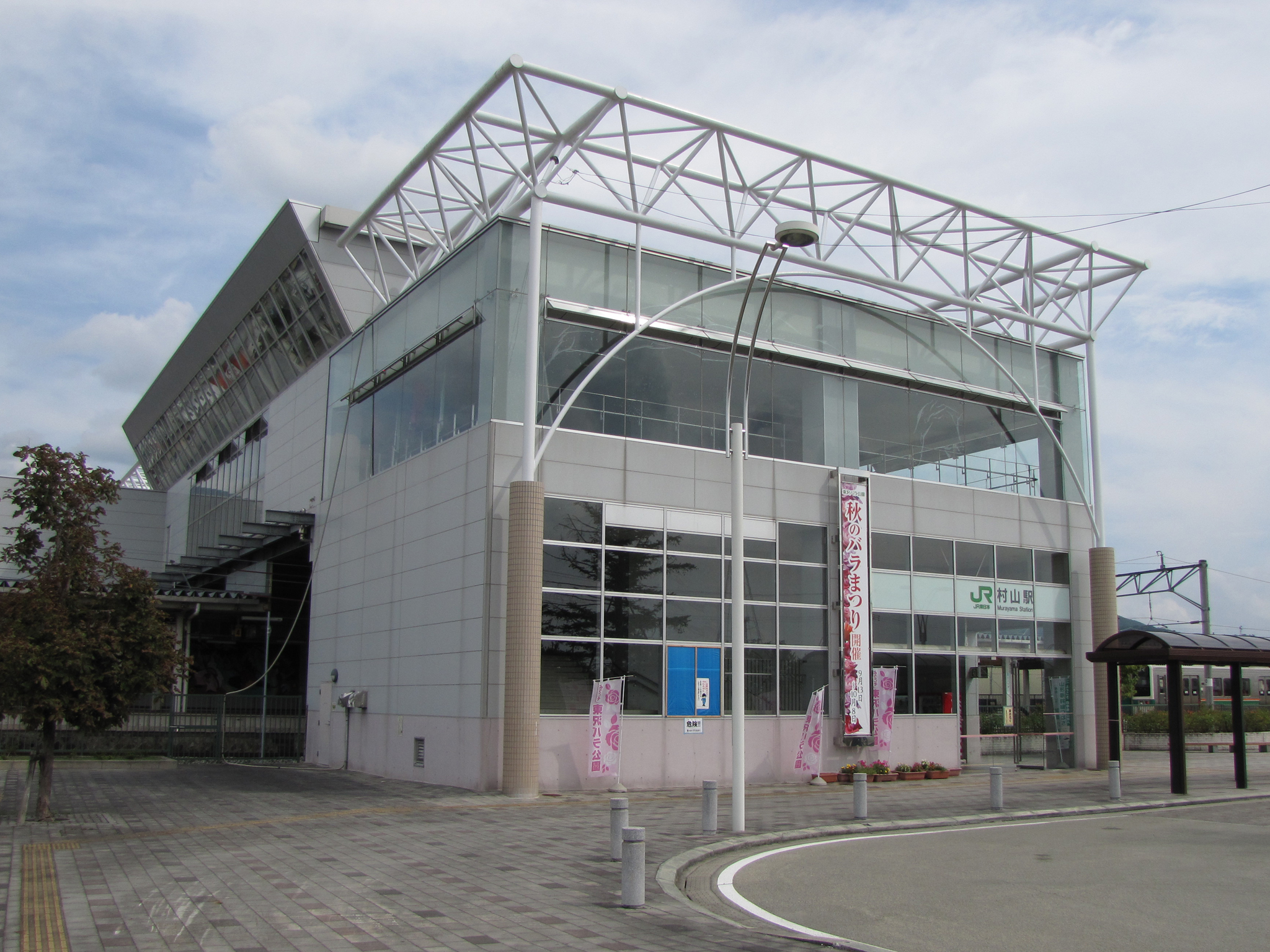
The west entrance in September 2012

The station has one side platform and one island platform connected to the station building by a footbridge. The station has a Midori no Madoguchi staffed ticket office.

=== Platforms ===
1	■ Yamagata Shinkansen	for Yamagata, Fukushima, Ōmiya, and Tokyo
1	■ Yamagata Line	for Tendō, and Yamagata
2	■ Yamagata Shinkansen	for Yamagata, Fukushima, Ōmiya, and Tokyo for Shinjō
2	■ Yamagata Line	for Tendō and Yamagata for Shinjō
3	■ Yamagata Shinkansen	for Shinjō
3	■ Yamagata Line	for Shinjō for Yamagata

== History ==
The station opened on 23 August 1901 as Tateoka Station (楯岡駅). A new station building was completed in March 1935. The station was absorbed into the JR East network upon the privatization of JNR on 1 April 1987. The station was renamed Murayama Station on 4 December 1999 with the start of Yamagata Shinkansen operations. The current station building was completed on the same date.

== Passenger statistics ==
In fiscal 2018, the station was used by an average of 1008 passengers daily (boarding passengers only).

== Surrounding area ==
- Murayama City Hall
- Murayama Post Office
- National Route 13

== See also ==
- List of railway stations in Japan
