= Sakurambo-Higashine Station =

Railway station in Higashine, Yamagata Prefecture, Japan

Sakurambo-Higashine Station さくらんぼ東根駅
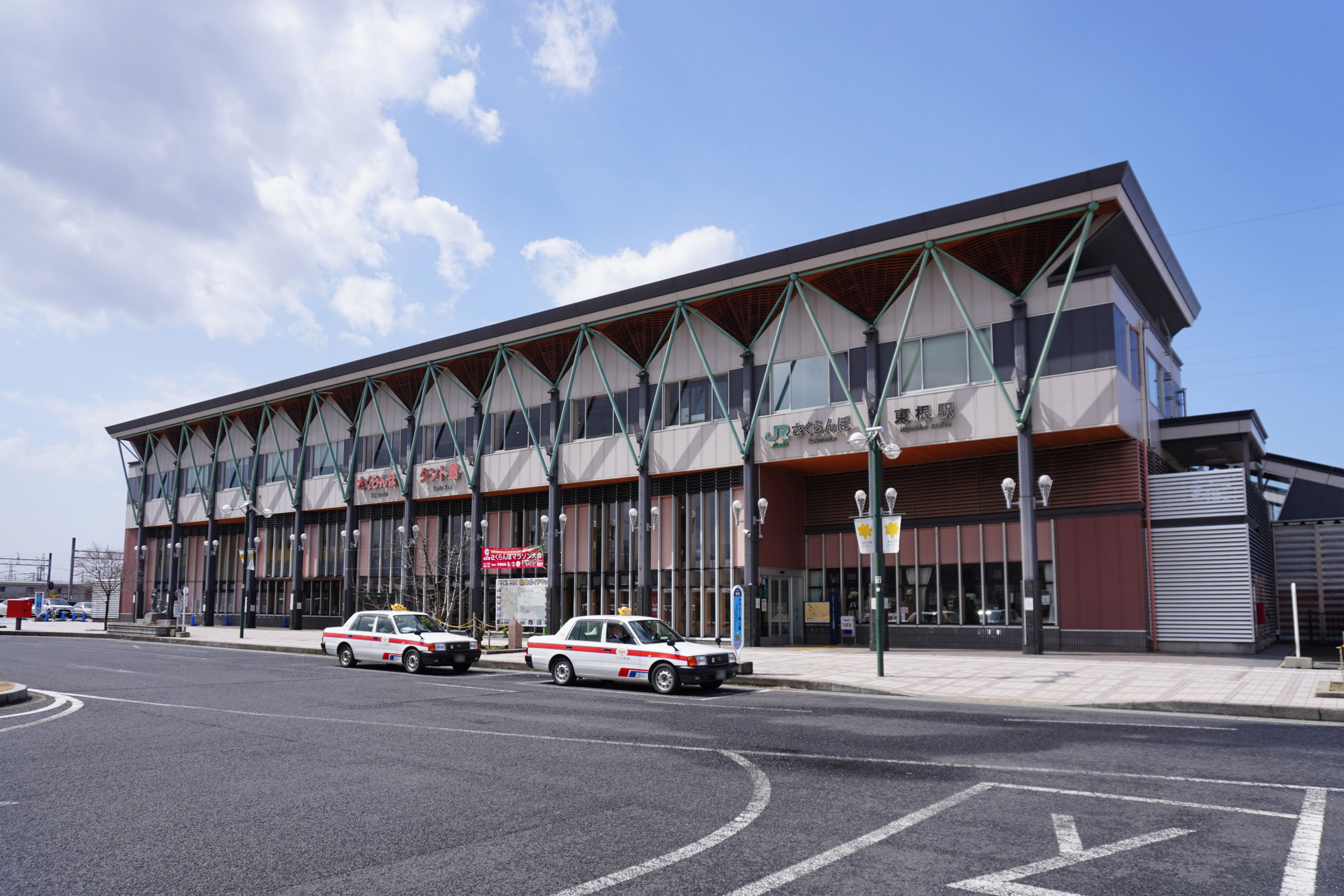
- West entrance in January 2008

General information
- Location: 1-1, Sakurambo Ekimae 1-chōme, Higashine-shi, Yamagata-ken 999-3720; Japan
- Coordinates: 38°25′43″N 140°22′51″E
- Operator: JR East
- Lines: Yamagata Shinkansen; Ōu Main Line
- Distance: 108.1 km (67.2 mi) from Fukushima
- Platforms: 2 side platforms
- Tracks: 2

Construction
- Structure type: At grade

Other information
- Status: Staffed (Midori no Madoguchi)

History
- Opened: 4 December 1999; 26 years ago

Passengers
- FY2018: 1,363 daily

Services
Preceding station	JR East	Following station
Tendō towards Tokyo	Yamagata Shinkansen Tsubasa	Murayama towards Shinjō
Jimmachi towards Fukushima	Yamagata Line	Higashine towards Shinjō
Location
- Location within Yamagata Prefecture Location within Japan

Sakurambo-Higashine Station (さくらんぼ東根駅, Sakuranbo-Higashine-eki) is a junction railway station in the city of Higashine, Yamagata Prefecture, Japan, operated by East Japan Railway Company (JR East).

== Lines ==
Sakurambo-Higashine Station is served by the Ōu Main Line and the Yamagata Shinkansen. It is located 108.1 kilometers from the terminus of both lines at Fukushima Station.

== Station layout ==
The station has two opposed side platforms and connected to the three-story station building by a footbridge. The station has a Midori no Madoguchi staffed ticket office.

=== Platforms ===
1	■ Yamagata Shinkansen	for Yamagata, Fukushima, Ōmiya, and Tokyo
1	■ Yamagata Line	for Tendō, and Yamagata
2	■ Yamagata Shinkansen	for Murayama for Shinjō
2	■ Yamagata Line	for Murayama for Shinjō

== History ==
The station began operation on December 4, 1999 as part of the Yamagata Shinkansen project.

== Passenger statistics ==
In fiscal 2018, the station was used by an average of 1363 passengers daily (boarding passengers only).

== Surrounding area ==
Higashine is in the central part of Yamagata Prefecture, in the Murayama Basin. Sendai City is to the east, Yamagata City to the south, and Tendo City. Higashine abounds with rich nature and hot springs. Three national highways — National Route 13, National Route 48 and National Route 287 — pass nearby. Yamagata Airport is in the city, facilitating traffic for high technology industries in the prefecture, making Higashine a major industrial center.

The eastern view from the station affords a dramatic panorama of snow-capped mountains.
