= Tend =

Tend may refer to:

- Bartend, to serve beverages behind a bar
- Tend and befriend, a behavioural pattern exhibited by human beings and some animal species when under threat
- Tending, or looking after trees, a part of silviculture

== See also ==
- Attention (disambiguation)
- Babysit
- Cultivation (disambiguation)
- Tenda (disambiguation)
- Tendency (disambiguation)
- Tender (disambiguation)
- Tendō (disambiguation)
- Tendon (disambiguation)
- Tendu (disambiguation)
