= Tendō =

Tendō or tendo can refer to:

== Places ==
- Tendō, Yamagata (天童市, -shi), a city in Japan
- Tendō Domain (天童藩, -han), a feudal domain in Edo period Japan, located in modern-day Yamagata Prefecture
- Tendō Station, a train station in Tendō

== Japanese family name ==
=== People ===
- Tendō clan, a Japanese kin group in Dewa Province during the Sengoku and Edo periods
- Tendo Nagenda (born 1975) American film executive, producer

=== Fictional characters ===
- Characters from the Japanese manga series Ranma ½
  - Akane Tendo (天道)
  - Kasumi Tendo
  - Nabiki Tendo
  - Soun Tendo
- Gai Tendo, a character in the 1999 video game Buriki-One
- Jyuka Tendou (Tendō Juka), a character in the television series Kamen Rider Kabuto
- Karen Tendo, a character in the light novel series Gamers!
- Mayumi Tendo (Tendō Mayumi, 天堂) a character in the Japanese manga series Battle Royale
- Rushuna Tendou (Tendō Rushuna), a character in the Japanese manga series Grenadier - The Senshi of Smiles
- Souji Tendou (Tendō Sōji), a character in the television series Kamen Rider Kabuto
- Tendo Choi a character in the science fiction film Pacific Rim (2013)
- Tendo Path (also known as Deva Path), a forbidden technique in the manga and anime series Naruto
- Yosuke Tendo, a character in the 2020 video game Yakuza: Like A Dragon

== Other ==
- Tendo (天道 "Way of Heaven"), a religion in Japan.
- Tendo, Latin term for tendon

== See also ==
- Tendo-ryu (disambiguation)
- Tentō (disambiguation)
- Tend (disambiguation)
- Tiandao (disambiguation), Chinese cognate of Tendō (天道)
