= Higashine Station =

Railway station in Higashine, Yamagata Prefecture, Japan

Higashine Station 東根駅
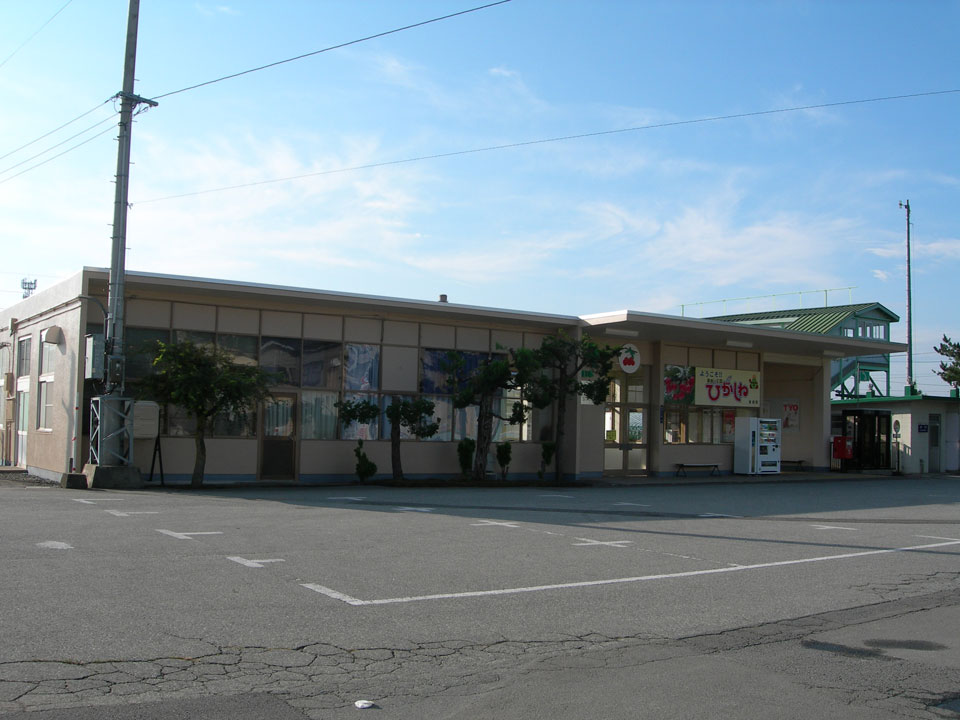
- Higashine Station in September 2008

General information
- Location: 8-1, Miyazaki 3-chōme, Higashine-shi, Yamagata-ken 999-3705; Japan
- Coordinates: 38°27′04″N 140°23′03″E
- Operator: JR East
- Line: ■ Ōu Main Line
- Distance: 110.6 km from Fukushima
- Platforms: 1 side platform

Other information
- Status: Unstaffed
- Website: Official website

History
- Opened: December 5, 1911

Services
Preceding station	JR East	Following station
Sakurambo-Higashine towards Fukushima	Yamagata Line	Murayama towards Shinjō
Location
- Location within Yamagata Prefecture Location within Japan

Higashine Station (東根駅, Higashine-eki) is a railway station located in the city of Higashine, Yamagata Prefecture, Japan, operated by the East Japan Railway Company (JR East).

== Lines ==
Higashine Station is served by the Ōu Main Line, and is located 110.6 rail kilometers from the terminus of the line at Fukushima Station.

== Station layout ==
The station has one island platform; however, with the completion of the Yamagata Shinkansen, one side of the platform is used for through traffic of the Shinkansen, leaving the station with effectively a single side platform for bi-directional traffic. The station is unattended.

== History ==
Higashine Station opened as a signal stop on December 5, 1911. The station was absorbed into the JR East network upon the privatization of the JNR on April 1, 1987.

== Surrounding area ==
- Higashime Post Office
- Higashine Onsen

== See also ==
- List of railway stations in Japan
