= Tiandao =

Tiandao (Chinese: 天道; pinyin: Tiāndào; lit. 'Way of Heaven'; Vietnamese: Thiên Đạo, Japanese: Tendō) is a Chinese word used in many philosophical and religious contexts in China and the Sinosphere, can refer specifically to:

- Xiantiandao, a group of Chinese religions
  - Yiguandao, a particular religion in this group
  - Tendo (religion), a Japanese sect of this religion

== Traditional thought ==
- Tao, often referred to as Tiandao, is an important concept passed down from ancient Chinese thinkers to the present day.

== Organizations ==
- Cheondoism, also known by the name Tiandao as the Chinese reading of its name
- Tiandao Association of the Republic of China, a new religious movement in China originating in Taiwan related to Yiguandao

== Other uses ==
- Mou Zongsan (1909–1995), New Confucian philosopher
  - A Manifesto for a Re-appraisal of Sinology and Reconstruction of Chinese Culture (1958), group work
- Huang-Lao 2nd-century BCE Chinese school of philosophy

== See also ==
- Tendō (disambiguation)
- Fight for Justice (天道), a Taiwanese TV series starring Angus Hsieh
- Way to Heaven
- The Way to Heaven
