= Tendō Station =

Railway station in Tendō, Yamagata Prefecture, Japan

Tendō Station 天童駅
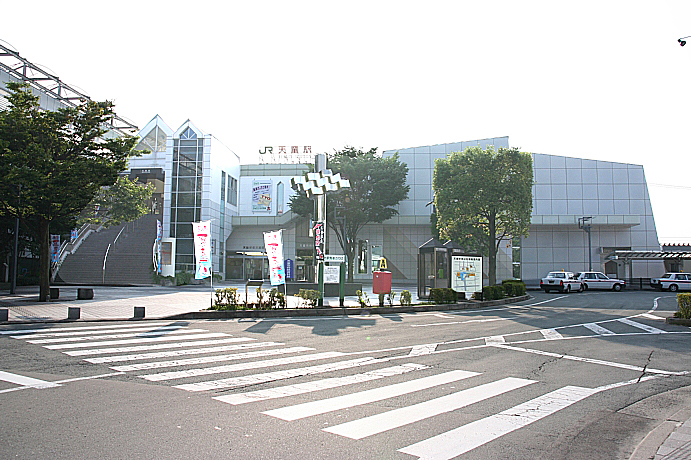
- The east entrance in August 2006

General information
- Location: Honchō 1-1-1, Tendō-shi, Yamagata-ken 994-0034; Japan
- Coordinates: 38°21′36″N 140°22′10″E
- Operator: JR East
- Lines: Yamagata Shinkansen; Ōu Main Line
- Distance: 100.4 km (62.4 mi) from Fukushima
- Platforms: 1 island + 1 side platform
- Tracks: 3

Construction
- Structure type: At grade

Other information
- Status: Staffed (Midori no Madoguchi)
- Website: Official website

History
- Opened: 23 August 1901; 125 years ago

Passengers
- FY2018: 1463

Services
Preceding station	JR East	Following station
Yamagata towards Tokyo	Yamagata Shinkansen Tsubasa	Sakurambo-Higashine towards Shinjō
Tendō-Minami towards Fukushima	Yamagata Line	Midaregawa towards Shinjō
Location
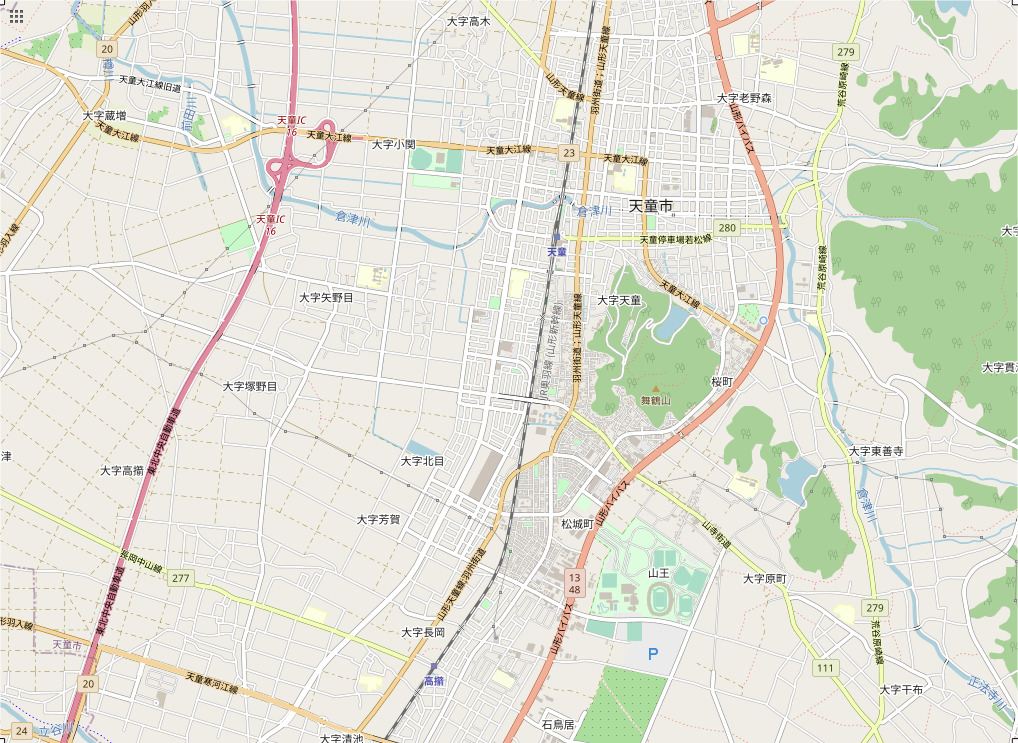
- Location within Tendo, Yamagata Location within Yamagata Prefecture Location within Japan

Tendō Station (天童駅, Tendō-eki) is a railway station in the city of Tendō, Yamagata, Japan, operated by East Japan Railway Company (JR East).

== Lines ==
Tendō Station is served by the Ōu Main Line and the Yamagata Shinkansen, and is located 100.4 kilometres (62.4 mi) rail kilometers from the terminus of both lines at Fukushima Station.

== Station layout ==
The station is an elevated station with one side platform and one island platform, serving three tracks. The station has a Midori no Madoguchi staffed ticket office.

=== Platforms ===
1	■ Yamagata Shinkansen	for Yamagata, Fukushima, Ōmiya, and Tokyo
1	■ Yamagata Line	for Yonezawa, and Yamagata
2	■ Yamagata Shinkansen	for Murayama and Shinjō
2	■ Yamagata Line	for Murayama and Shinjō
3	■ Yamagata Shinkansen	for Murayama and Shinjō

== History ==
Tendō Station opened on 23 August 1901. The station was absorbed into the JR East network upon the privatization of JNR on 1 April 1987. A new station building was completed in September 1992. The Yamagata Shinkansen began operations from 4 December 1999.

== Passenger statistics ==
In fiscal 2018, the station was used by an average of 1,463 passengers daily (boarding passengers only). The passenger figures for previous years are as shown below.

Fiscal year	Daily average
2000	1,938
2005	1,828
2010	1,701
2015	1,588

== Surrounding area ==
The station is in the heart of Tendō with the bus station and shops adjacent.

- Tendō City Hall
- Tendō post office
- Hiroshige Art Museum
- Tendō Shogi Museum
- Tendō onsen
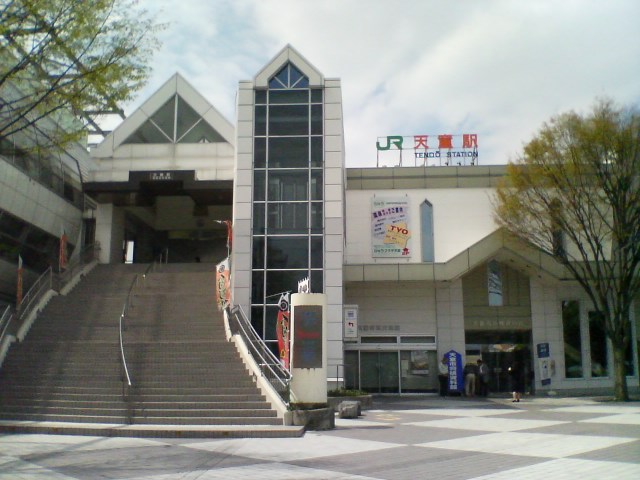
Tendo Station (top) and Tendo City Shogi Museum (right)

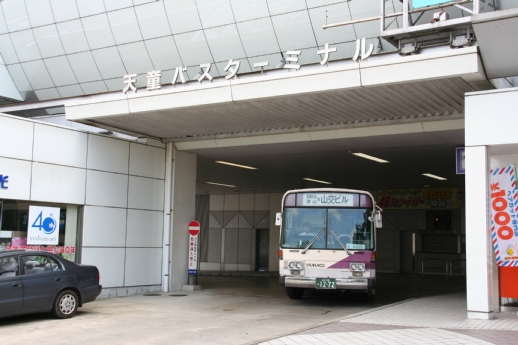
Tendō Bus Terminal (adjacent to the station)
