= Tendon (disambiguation) =

A tendon is a high-tensile-strength band of connective tissue that connects muscle to bone.

Tendon may also refer to:

- Tendon as food, use of tendons in cuisine in various cultures
- Tendon (Japanese cuisine), a type of Japanese rice bowl dish or donburi
- Tendon, Vosges, a commune in the Vosges département in France
- Tendon (album), by Reniss, 2016
- Tendon, a reinforcing element in prestressed concrete
- "Tendons" (song), by the Joy Formidable

== See also ==
- Tenon, type of joint that connects two pieces of wood or other material
- Tend (disambiguation)
