= Tendency =

Tendency or tendencies may refer to:

- Seasonal tendencies, qualities of economic phenomena that appear to be related to the calendar
- "Tendencies", a song by Hollywood Undead on the 2011 album American Tragedy
- Tendency film, socially conscious, left-leaning films produced in Japan during the 1920s and 1930s
- Tendency (party politics), particularly factions within Marxist parties, or Marxist factions in larger parties

== See also ==
- Tend (disambiguation)
- Tendenz
