= E8 Series Shinkansen =

Japanese high speed train type

E8 series
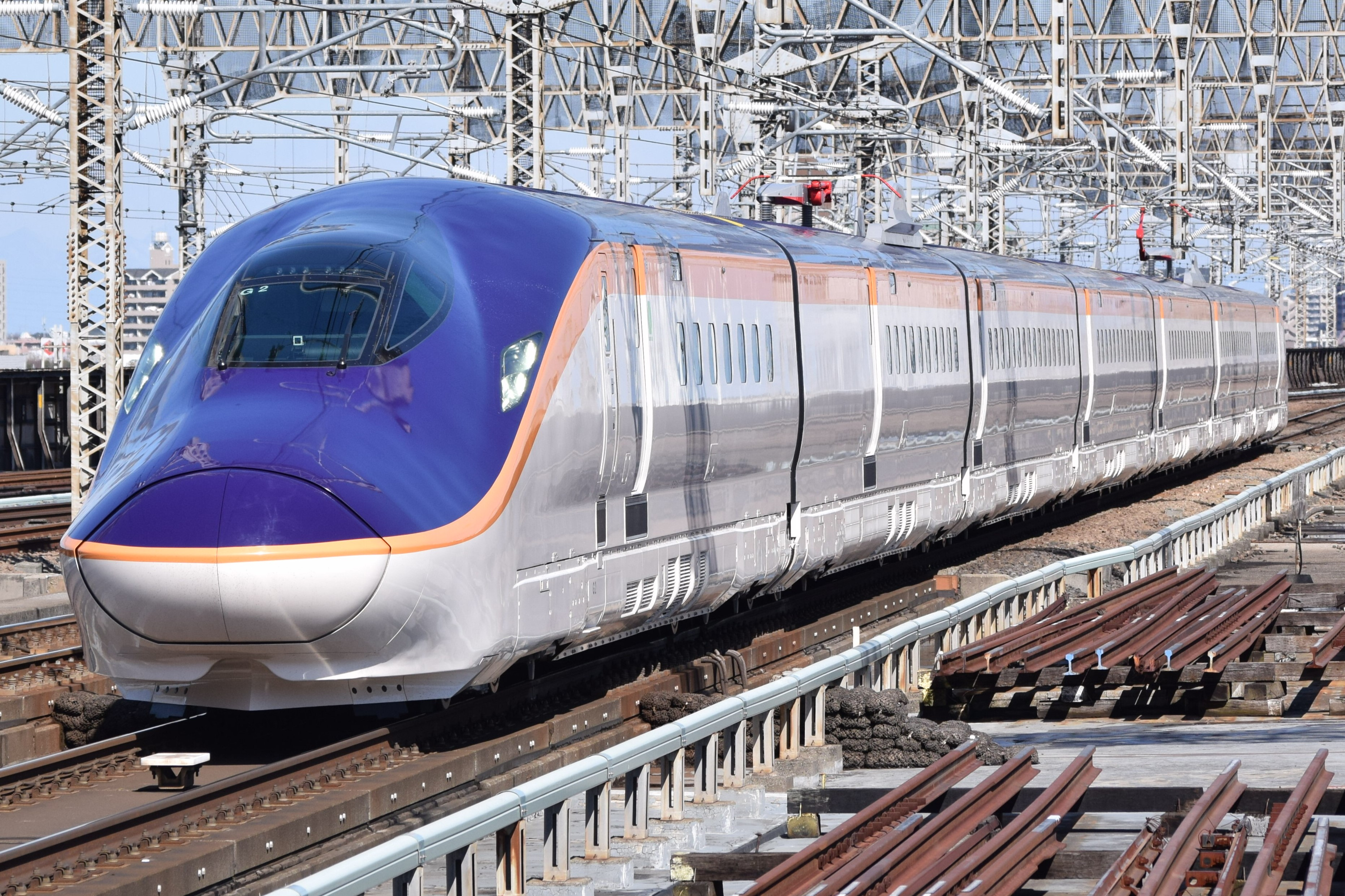
- E8 series set in March 2024
- Stock type: Electric multiple unit
- In service: 2024–present
- Manufacturers: Hitachi Rail; Kawasaki Railcar Manufacturing
- Designer: Ken Okuyama
- Family name: Mini-Shinkansen
- Replaced: E3 series
- Constructed: 2022–2026
- Entered service: 16 March 2024; 2 years ago
- Number under construction: 23 vehicles (4 sets)
- Number built: 66 vehicles (11 sets)
- Number in service: 66 vehicles (11 sets) (as of June 2025)
- Formation: 7 cars per trainset
- Fleet numbers: G1–G15
- Capacity: 355 (26 Green + 329 ordinary)
- Operator: JR East
- Depot: Yamagata
- Lines served: Yamagata Shinkansen; Tōhoku Shinkansen

Specifications
- Height: 3.65 m (12 ft 0 in)
- Doors: 1 per side, per car
- Maximum speed: 300 km/h (190 mph)
- Electric systems: Overhead line: 25 kV 50 Hz AC; 20 kV 50 Hz AC
- Current collection: Pantograph
- Safety systems: DS-ATC, RS-ATC, ATS-P
- Multiple working: Up to two units, E5 series
- Track gauge: 1,435 mm (4 ft 8 1/2 in) standard gauge

The E8 series (Japanese: E8系) is a Japanese Shinkansen high-speed train type operated by the East Japan Railway Company (JR East). It operates exclusively on Tsubasa services on the Yamagata Shinkansen, a mini-Shinkansen line between Shinjo in Yamagata Prefecture and Fukushima, at speeds of up to 130 kilometres per hour (81 mph). From Fukushima, services continue to and from Tokyo on the Tōhoku Shinkansen, where E8 series trainsets are typically coupled to or uncoupled from Yamabiko services operated by E5 series trains. Compared with the E3 series it replaced, the E8 series is capable of operating at speeds of up to 300 kilometres per hour (190 mph) on the Tōhoku Shinkansen, an increase from 275 kilometres per hour (171 mph).

A total of 15 seven-car trainsets are scheduled to be built by Hitachi Rail and Kawasaki Railcar Manufacturing between 2022 and 2026. Seventeen trainsets were originally planned; however, the order was reduced in response to decreased travel demand during the COVID-19 pandemic. The first trainset was delivered on 30 January 2023, and the E8 series entered revenue service on 16 March 2024.

== Design ==
The overall styling was overseen by Japanese industrial designer Yamagata native Ken Okuyama, in cooperation with Kawasaki Heavy Industries. The design is intended to reflect the landscape and cultural identity of Yamagata Prefecture.

The exterior livery continues the visual language established by the repainted E3 series, also designed by Okuyama. The body is finished in white, symbolising the snow of Mount Zaō; deep purple, inspired by the Mandarin duck, the prefectural bird of Yamagata; and accents of yellow derived from the safflower, the prefectural flower.

The E8 series features a long, aerodynamically optimized nose to reduce tunnel boom and enable higher maximum operating speeds. The nose is approximately 9 metres (30 ft) long, about 3 metres (9.8 ft) longer than that of the E3 series, allowing an increase in maximum operating speed on the Tōhoku Shinkansen from 275 to 300 kilometres per hour (171 to 186 mph).

The aerodynamic design incorporates technologies and lessons derived from the Fastech 360 experimental train and the E6 series developed for the Akita Shinkansen. Like the E6 series, the E8 employs an "arrow-line" nose profile, a design concept first tested on the Fastech 360 to improve aerodynamic performance and reduce noise at high speeds.

In contrast to the E6 series, which features a substantially longer nose and a maximum operating speed of 320 kilometres per hour (200 mph), but reduced seating capacity, the E8 balances higher speed capability with passenger accommodation. On the Yamagata Shinkansen, where high-speed running on the Tōhoku Shinkansen accounts for a smaller of the route and services are frequently coupled with Yamabiko service trains making intermediate stops, the 300-kilometre-per-hour (190 mph) top speed was selected to maintain timetable compatibility with minimal impact on seating capacity.

The E8 also does not incorporate the active tilting system used on the E6, as tilting was judged unnecessary given the relatively short high-speed running section. Each trainset is equipped with full active suspension to improve ride quality across varying track conditions. To ensure reliable operation in winter conditions, the E8 series is equipped with heated bogies to prevent snow and ice accumulation.

The 7-car E8 series trainsets offer two service classes—Green Car (business class) and ordinary—with a total seating capacity of 355 passengers, 39 fewer than the E3 series sets they replace. Seating in both classes is arranged 2+2 abreast, consistent with other mini-Shinkansen rolling stock. AC power outlets are provided at all seats, and both passenger cabins and vestibules are equipped with security cameras. The Green Car includes space for one wheelchair user, while ordinary car 12 (immediately behind the Green Car) provides space for three. A universal-access restroom along with a multipurpose room is located between the cars. All seven cars are equipped to accommodate large baggage.

Interior design motifs similarly draw on regional themes. In the Green Car, seat upholstery is finished in deep green tones intended to evoke the forests of Mount Gassan. In ordinary cars, the seat moquette is inspired by the traditional safflower dyeing process, with a gradient ranging from bright yellow to red. In both classes, aisle flooring—carpeted in Green Cars and linoleum in ordinary cars—incorporates patterns inspired by the Mogami River, which runs along much of the line’s length. Power outlets are provided at all seats.

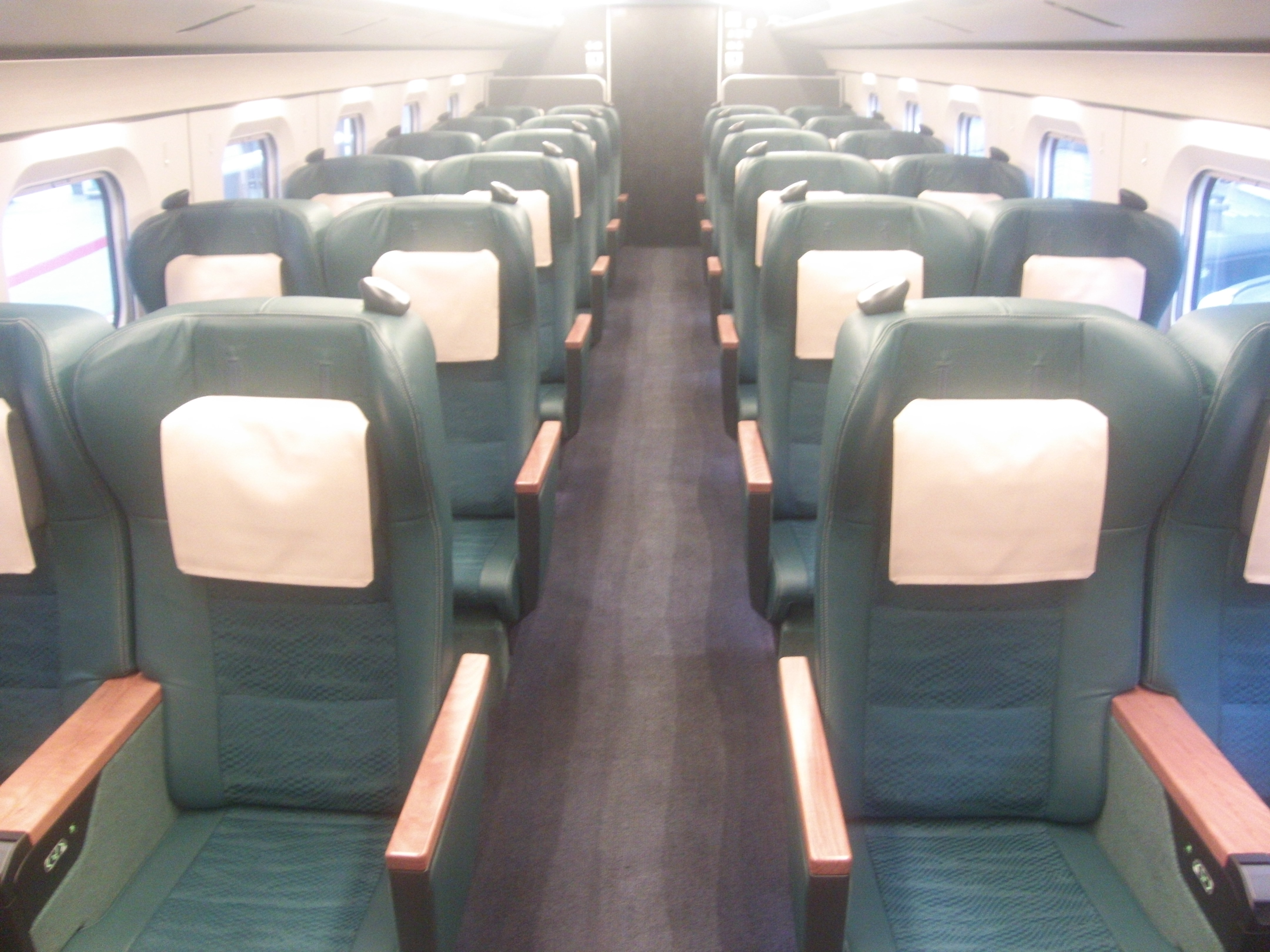
Green car interior

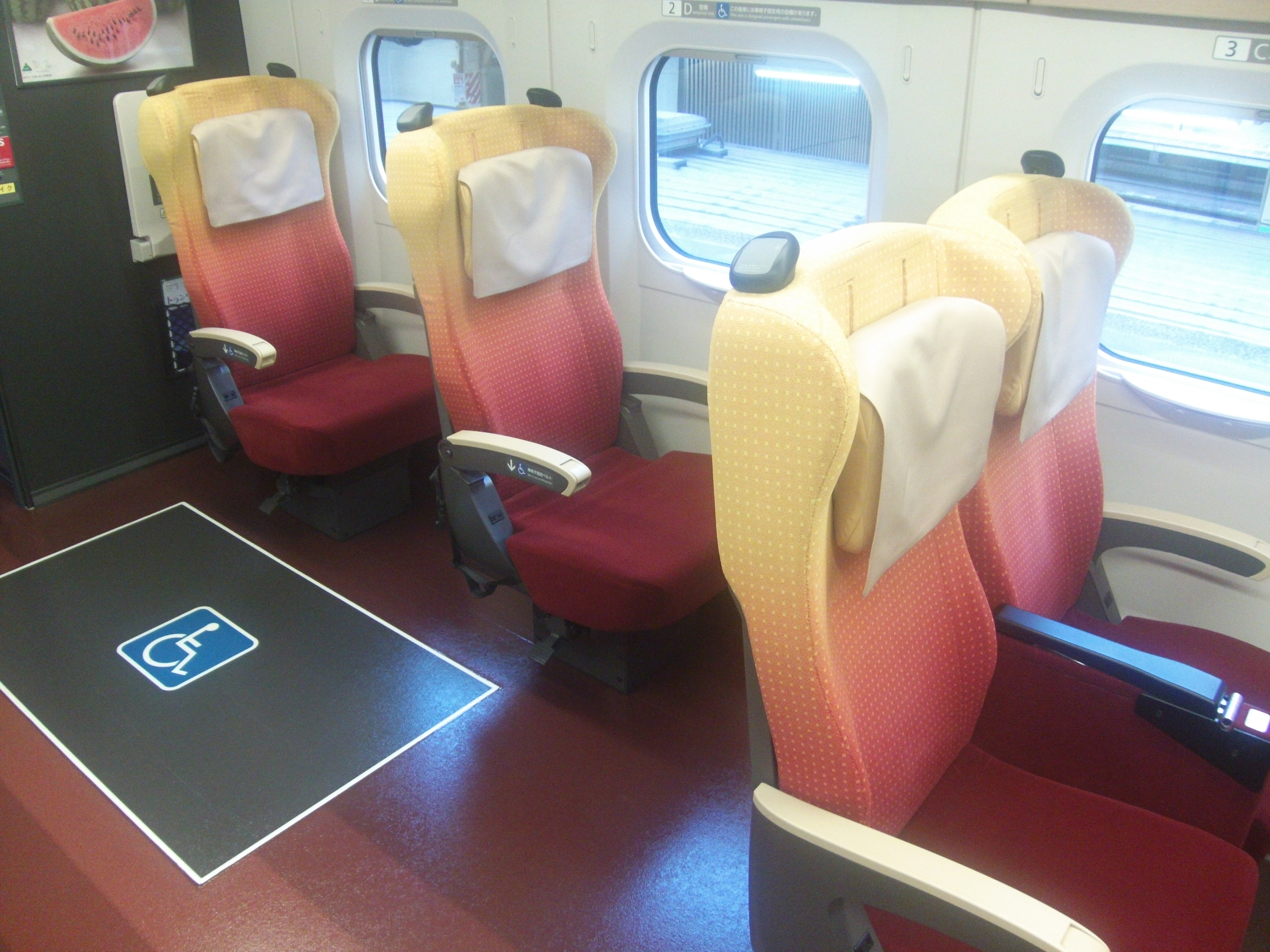
Wheelchair space

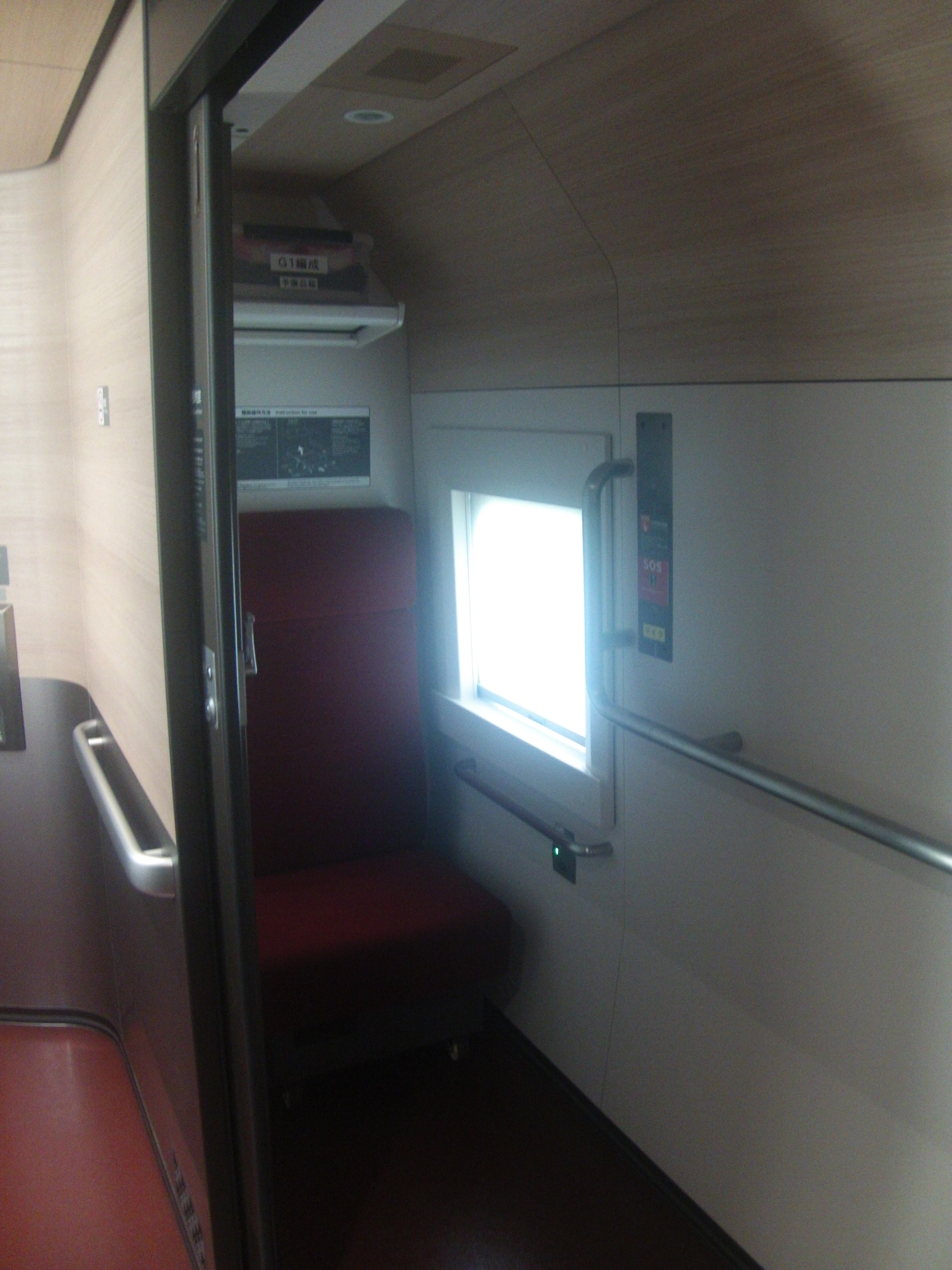
Multipurpose Room

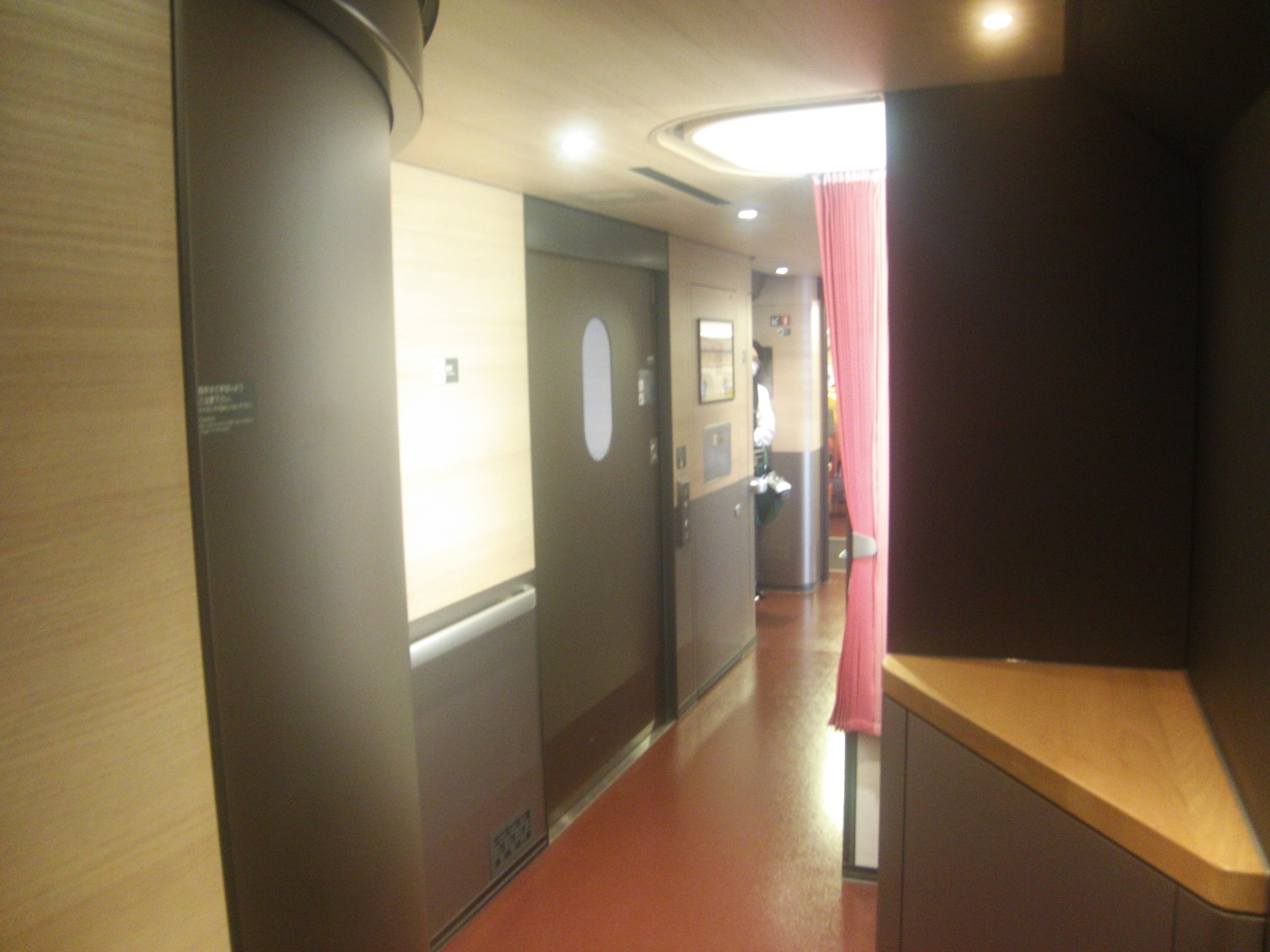
Public spaces

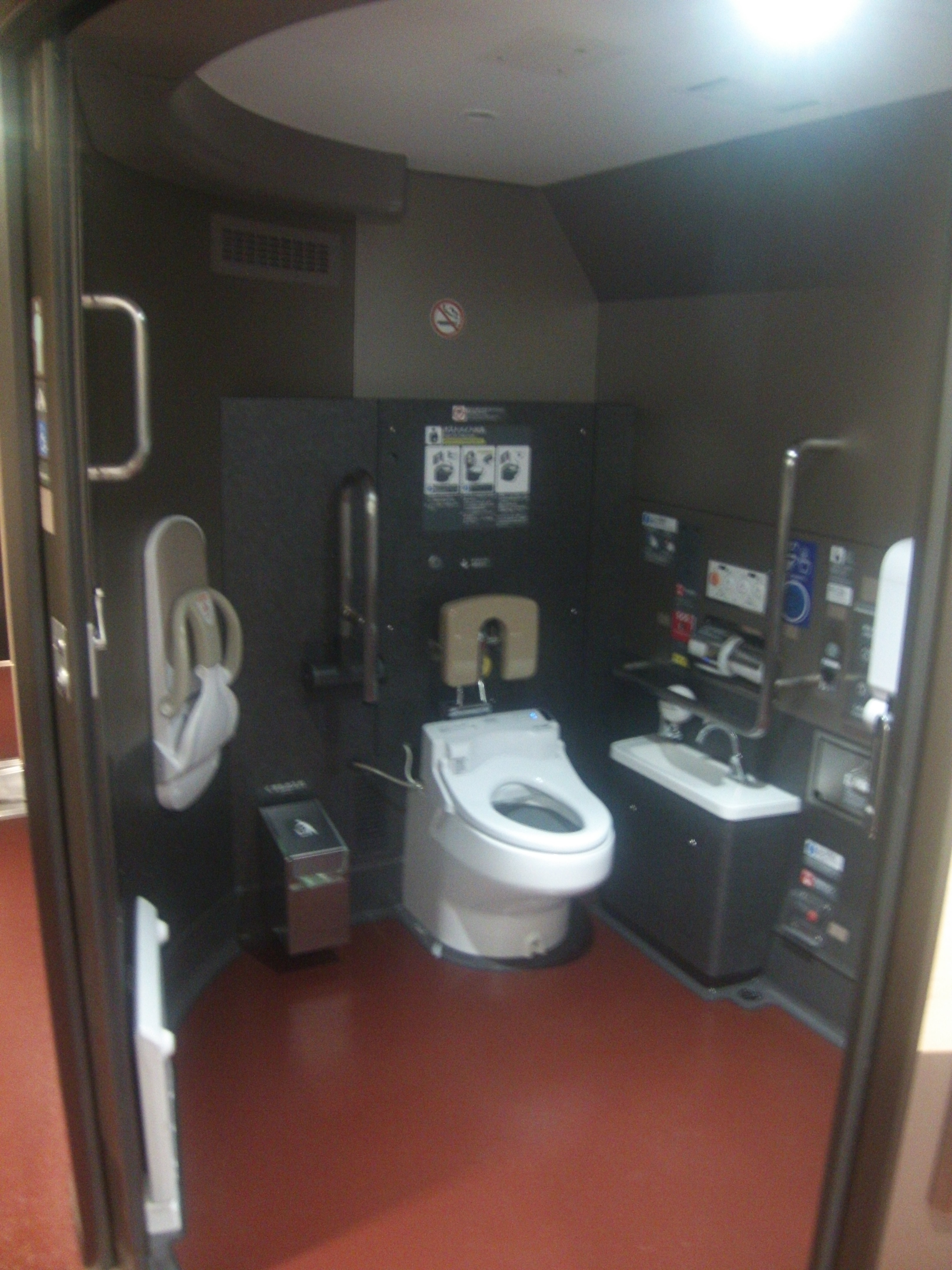
Toilet

== Formation ==
The E8 series uses the same 5M2T-formation as the E3 and E6 series mini-Shinkansen types with five powered (motor), and two non-powered (trailer) cars.

The production E8 series sets are formed as follows, with car 11 at the Tokyo end and car 17 at the Shinjo end.

| Car No. | 11 | 12 | 13 | 14 | 15 | 16 | 17 |
|---|---|---|---|---|---|---|---|
| Designation | Msc | T1 | M1 | M2 | M3 | T2 | Mc |
| Class | Green | Ordinary | | | | | |
| Numbering | E811‑0 | E828‑0 | E825‑0 | E825‑100 | E827‑0 | E829‑0 | E821‑0 |
| Capacity | 26 | 36 | 66 | 62 | 62 | 58 | 42 |
| Facilities | Wheelchair space, conductor's office | Toilet, wheelchair space | | Toilet | Toilet | Toilet | |

- Cars 12 and 16 are each equipped with a single-arm pantograph.

== Fleet list ==
The trainsets are built by Hitachi and Kawasaki Railcar Manufacturing. The remaining sets are scheduled for delivery by JFY 2026.

| Set No. | Manufacturer | Delivered |
|---|---|---|
| G1 | Hitachi/Kawasaki | 30 January 2023 |
| G2 | Hitachi | 25 December 2023 |
| G3 | Hitachi | 20 February 2024 |
| G4 | Hitachi | 22 March 2024 |
| G5 | Hitachi | 20 May 2024 |
| G6 | Hitachi | 24 June 2024 |
| G7 | Kawasaki | 10 September 2024 |
| G8 | Kawasaki | 21 October 2024 |
| G9 | Hitachi | 22 December 2024 |
| G10 | Kawasaki | 31 March 2025 |
| G11 | Kawasaki | 19 May 2025 |
| G12 | | |
| G13 | | |
| G14 | | |
| G15 | | |

== Incidents ==
=== Auxiliary power unit malfunctions ===
On 17 June 2025, four E8 series trainsets experienced auxiliary power unit (APU) malfunctions. The APU converts electricity collected from the overhead lines into the appropriate forms required by onboard systems, including traction motors and cooling equipment. Each trainset is equipped with two APUs to provide redundancy.

The most serious incident involved set G11, delivered one month earlier, which lost power during a test run on the Tōhoku Shinkansen at 11:24 am between Utsunomiya and Nasushiobara stations. The failure blocked the line, stranded passengers on two following trains, and resulted in the cancellation of 86 services and delays to 138 others across the Tōhoku, Yamagata, and Akita Shinkansen lines. Over the following four hours, three additional E8 series trainsets experienced similar malfunctions.

In response, JR East suspended independent operation of the E8 series, requiring the trains to operate only in multiple working and effectively removing them from regular Yamagata Shinkansen service. Several E3 series trainsets were temporarily returned to service, but most through services to the Tōhoku Shinkansen were cancelled and operations were reduced to approximately 80% of the normal timetable.

The subsequent investigation determined that later-production E8 series trainsets were operating with higher-than-expected control currents, resulting in elevated internal temperatures within the APUs. This condition, combined with the hot summer weather, led to the failure of protective components, allowing excessive current to reach the semiconductors in six APUs across the affected trainsets, leading to a loss of power. More robust protective elements were installed and control settings were revised to better safeguard the components. Following these modifications, JR East announced that independent operation of the E8 series and through services to Tokyo would gradually resume from 1 August 2025.

== See also ==
- List of high-speed trains
