= Tento =

Tento may refer to:

- Mount Tento, on the island of Hokkaido in Japan
- Tentō (天灯), Japanese for sky lantern
- Tentō (天道), a district in the city of Iizuka, Fukuoka, Japan
  - Tentō Station
- Tento (天都), a city in the series Grenadier
- Portuguese for tiento, a musical genre originating in 15th century Spain

== See also ==
- Tendō (disambiguation)
