= Mini-Shinkansen =

Conversion of track gauge for use by Shinkansen trains

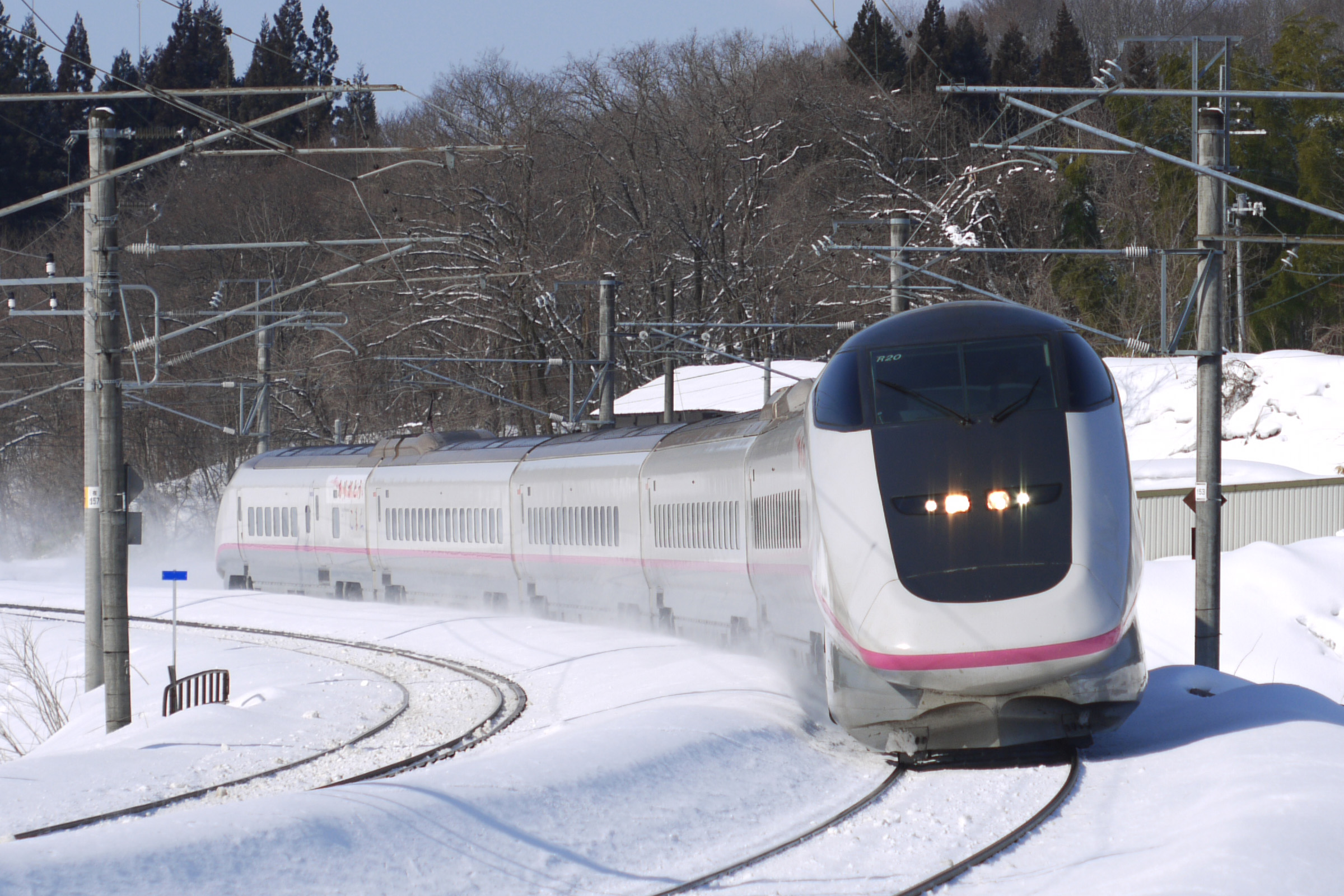
An E3 series mini-Shinkansen train on the Akita Shinkansen in March 2014

Mini-Shinkansen (Japanese: ミニ新幹線) is the name given in Japan to the concept of running high speed Shinkansen trains over low speed conventional tracks as a through service.

The existing 1,067 mm (3 ft 6 in) narrow gauge railway lines are converted to 1,435 mm (4 ft 8 1/2 in) standard gauge to allow operation of Shinkansen trains. While the track gauge is widened, the original loading gauge is retained, requiring the use of specially designed rolling stock with a narrower cross-section, leading to the "mini-Shinkansen" designation. The speed is also unchanged at 130 kilometres per hour (81 mph) due to the legacy infrastructure. (On the high speed lines, the mini-Shinkansen run at the same speed as regular Shinkansen.)

Two mini-Shinkansen routes have been constructed: the Yamagata Shinkansen, which opened in 1992, and the Akita Shinkansen, which opened in 1997. Both connect to the high-speed Tōhoku Shinkansen for direct service to and from Tokyo.

== Concept ==
The mini-Shinkansen concept was first considered by Japanese National Railways (JNR), but was not formally proposed until November 1987, following the formation of East Japan Railway Company (JR East). The concept involves regauging existing 1,067 mm (3 ft 6 in) narrow gauge lines to the 1,435 mm (4 ft 8 1/2 in) standard gauge used on the Shinkansen network, to allow through-running on a main high-speed Shinkansen line. While the track gauge is widened, the loading gauge remains unchanged, requiring specialized rolling stock with a narrower 2.945-metre (9 ft 8 in) cross-section, compared to the standard 3.35-metre (11 ft) width.

To compensate for the narrower car bodies, these trains generally have 2×2 seating in ordinary class, compared with the 2×3 configuration of typical Shinkansen trains, and are fitted with retractable gap fillers that flip up at main line Shinkansen stations to bridge the gap between the train and the platform.

Mini-Shinkansen sets are capable of high-speed operation on Shinkansen tracks—up to 320 kilometres per hour (200 mph) for the E6 series—either on their own or coupled to full-sized Shinkansen sets. On converted narrow-gauge lines, they operate at conventional speeds of around 130 kilometres per hour (81 mph), although track improvements can enable higher speeds where feasible.

== Yamagata Shinkansen ==
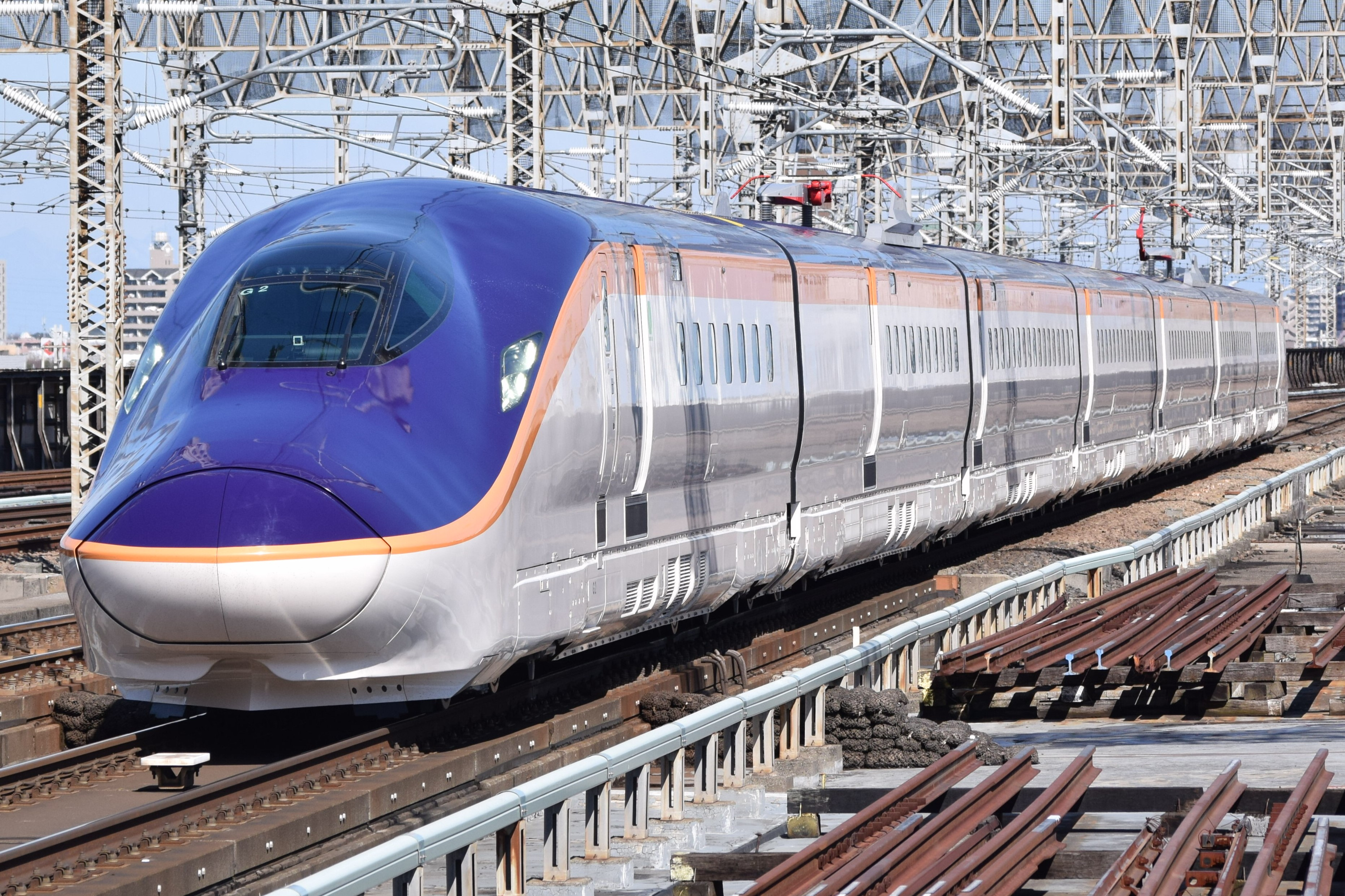
An E8 series set used on the Yamagata Shinkansen in March 2024

The first mini-Shinkansen route was the Yamagata Shinkansen, converted from the a 87.1-kilometre (54.1 mi) section of the Ōu Main Line between Fukushima on the Tohoku Shinkansen and Yamagata in Yamagata Prefecture. Conversion work began in 1988, and Yamagata Shinkansen services commenced on 1 July 1992, operated by a new fleet of 400 series trains operating Yamabiko services. Trains ran at up to 240 kilometres per hour (150 mph) on the Tōhoku Shinkansen section and 130 kilometres per hour (81 mph) on the Yamagata Shinkansen section. Following the success of the initial conversion, a further 61.5 kilometres (38.2 mi) of track was re-gauged to reach Shinjō, opening on 4 December 1999. The introduction of E8 series trains on the line in 2024 increased the maximum operating speed on the Tōhoku Shinkansen section to 300 kilometres per hour (190 mph).

== Akita Shinkansen ==
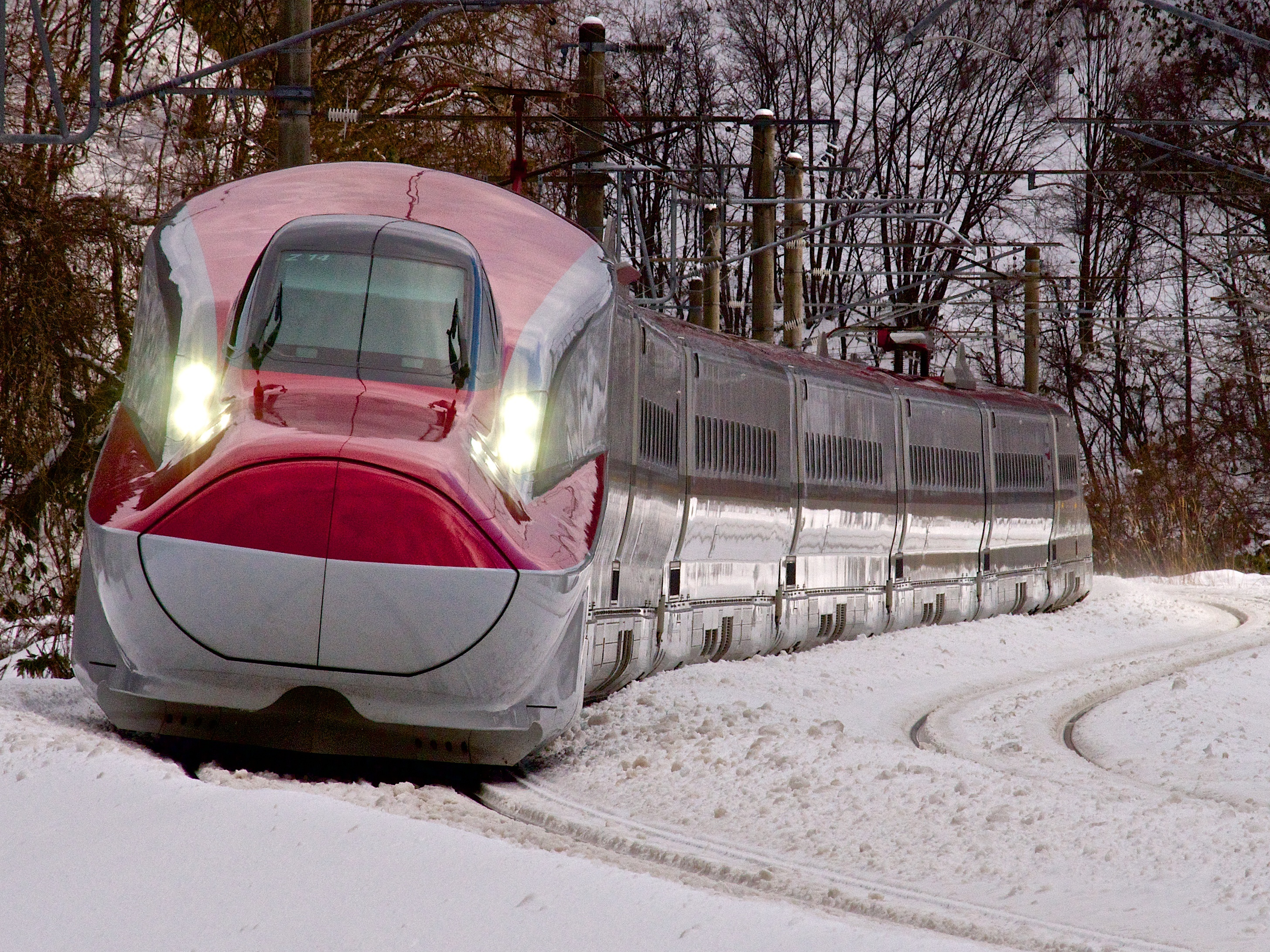
E6 series set on the Akita Shinkansen in January 2014

Following the success of the Yamagata Shinkansen, a second mini-Shinkansen route was developed from Morioka in Iwate Prefecture, then the northern terminus of the Tōhoku Shinkansen, to Akita in Akita Prefecture. This involved regauging the 75.6-kilometre (47.0 mi) Tazawako Line from Morioka to Ōmagari and 51.7 kilometres (32.1 mi) of the Ōu Main Line from Ōmagari to Akita. The Akita Shinkansen opened on 22 March 1997 with E3 series trains operating Komachi services. The introduction of E6 series trains on the line in 2013 enabled the maximum operating speed on the Tōhoku Shinkansen section to be increased to 320 kilometres per hour (200 mph) in 2014.

== Rolling stock ==
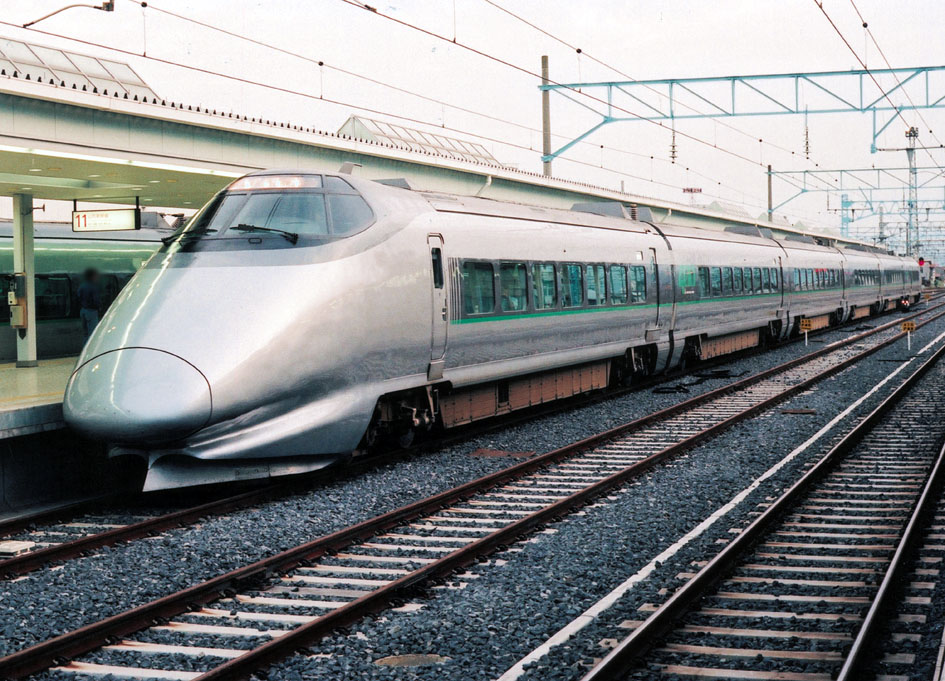
A 400 series, the first mini-Shinkansen type, in its original paint scheme

The following rolling stock has been built for use on mini-Shinkansen lines:

- 400 series, Yamagata Shinkansen (in service 1992–2010)
- E3 series, Akita Shinkansen (in service 1997–2014) and Yamagata Shinkansen (since 1999)
- E926 East i, track and overhead wire inspection train (since 2001)
- E955 Fastech 360Z, experimental test train (2006–2008)
- E6 series, Akita Shinkansen (since 2013)
- E8 series, Yamagata Shinkansen (since 2024)

== See also ==
- Gauge Change Train, an experimental train designed to operate on both narrow-gauge and Shinkansen routes
- Super Tokkyū, a concept for building narrow-gauge lines to Shinkansen standards
