= Tenda =

Tenda may refer to:

== Places ==
- Tende (Italian: Tenda), a commune and town in southeastern France, formerly part of Italy
  - Col de Tende (Italian: Colle di Tenda), an Alpine mountain pass
    - Col de Tende Road Tunnel, between France and Italy
- Tenta, Cyprus or Tenda, a Neolithic settlement
- Tenda Elephant Reserve, in the Kuldiha Wildlife Sanctuary, Balasore district, Odisha, India

== Other uses ==
- Construtora Tenda, a Brazilian construction company
- Tenda people, an ethnolinguistic group native to Senegal, Guinea, and Guinea-Bissau
- Tenda, a character and tribe in the video game EarthBound
- Tenda Dril, in the List of Miracleman characters

== See also ==
- Beatrice Lascaris di Tenda, mistaken name for Beatrice Cane c. 1372–1418, a member of the Cane family
- Tendaguru Formation, fossil-rich formations in Tanzania
- Tend (disambiguation)
