= Ryu =

Ryū (龍/竜, 隆, 流, りゅう, リュウ, Ryū) is a Japanese masculine given name and family name meaning "dragon", "noble", "prosperous", or "flow". Ryū, Ryu, or ryu may also refer to:

== Fiction ==
- Ryū (manga), a 1986 series by Masao Yajima and Akira Oze
- Dragon: the Old Potter's Tale (龍, Ryū), a 1919 book by Ryūnosuke Akutagawa
- Monthly Comic Ryū, a manga magazine in Japan

=== Characters ===
- Ryu (Breath of Fire), the protagonist in the Breath of Fire series
- Ryu (Street Fighter), a leading character in the Street Fighter franchise
- Ryū Daikōji, a character from Little Battlers Experience
- Ryu Hayabusa, the protagonist in the Ninja Gaiden series
- Ryu Higashi, a character from J.A.K.Q. Dengekitai
- Ryu Jose, a character from Mobile Suit Gundam
- Ryu Kumon, a minor character in Ranma 1/2
- Ryu Nakanishi, Science Ninja Team member G-5
- Ryu Tanaka, a character from Haikyuu!!
- Ryu Tendoh, a character from Choujin Sentai Jetman
- Ryū Tsuji, a character from Special A
- "Wooden Sword" Ryu, a Shaman King character
- A character from Fist of the North Star

== People ==
- Chishū Ryū (笠 智衆, 1904–1993), Japanese actor
- Hirofumi Ryu (笠 浩史, born 1965), Japanese politician
- Ryu Fujisaki (藤崎 竜, born 1971), Japanese manga artist
- Ryu Lee, an alternate ring name of the Mexican wrestler Dragon Lee
- Ryu Matsumoto (松本 龍, born 1951), Japanese politician
- Ryu Shionoya (塩谷 立, born 1950), Japanese politician
- Ryu, a member of the musical group Styles of Beyond
- Ryutaro Nakahara (Ryu☆), Japanese musician and DJ
- ryukahr, American streamer and YouTuber

== Other uses ==
- Ryū, the word for a Japanese dragon
- Ryū (school), a school of thought or discipline (for example a fighting school)
- ryu, the ISO 639-3 code for the Okinawan language
- Ryu SDN, an open source component-based Software-defined networking framework

== See also ==
- Ryu (Korean name) (유 or 류 / 柳, 劉, 兪, 庾), a common Korean family name
