= Kenji Shimizu =

Japanese aikido teacher and style founder

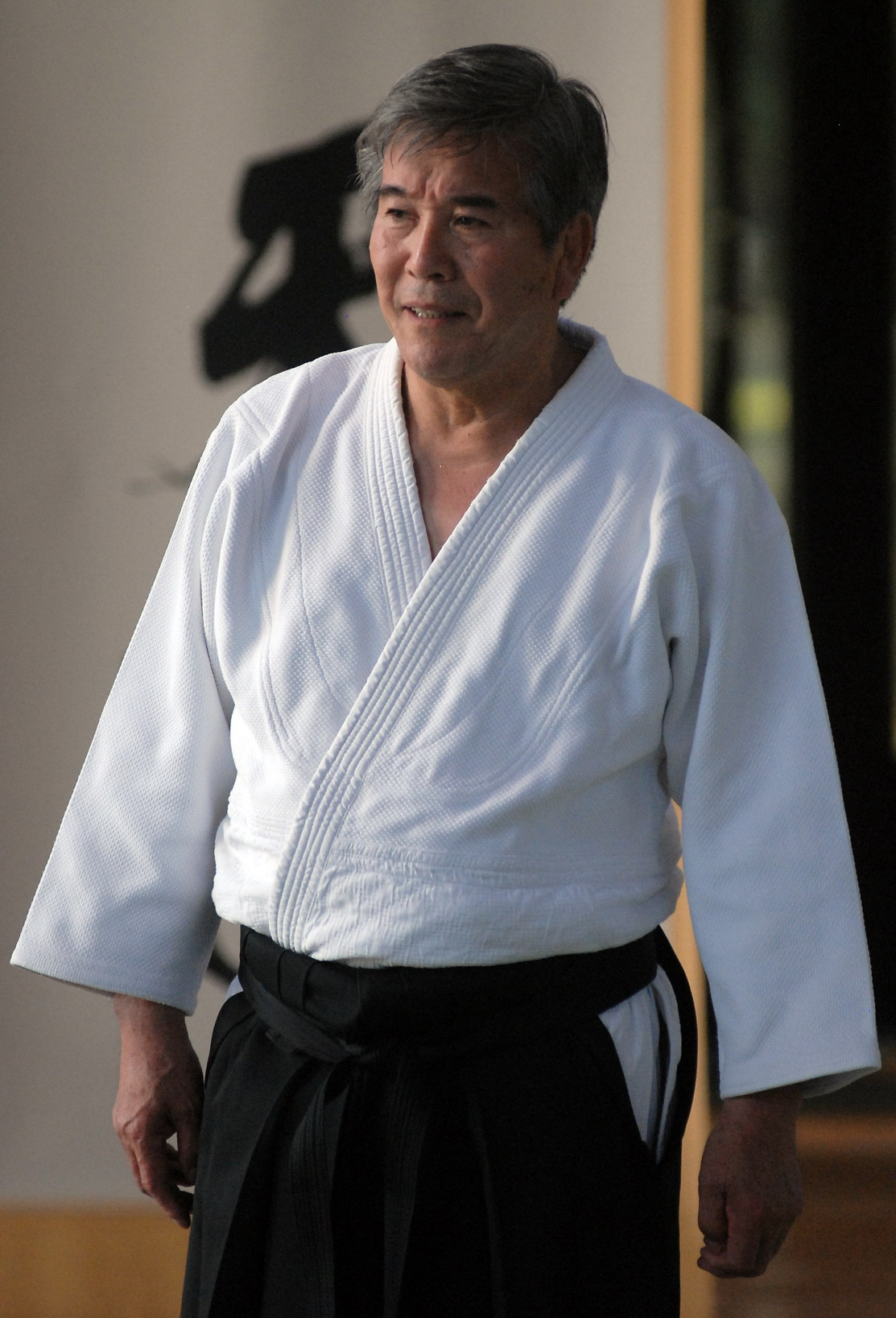
Kenji Shimizu on practice seminary in Novi Sad 2007.

Kenji Shimizu (清水 健二, Shimizu Kenji), b. 1940, is an aikido teacher and founder of the aikido style Tendo-ryu Aikido (天道流).

Shimizu was born in 1940 in Fukuoka, Japan. He had been training judo since childhood and held a 4th dan in this art when he changed to aikido in 1963. He then became one of the last personal students of the aikido founder Morihei Ueshiba. After Ueshiba died in 1969, Shimizu, then with a 7th dan in aikido, founded his own school in Tōkyō named Tendoryu (School of the Way of Heaven).

Tendoryu Aikido is characterized by its large and clear movements, emphasizing naturalness and harmonic flow of motion.

Since 1978, Shimizu has regularly held seminars in Germany and other European countries. A German Tendoryu Society was founded in 1993.

He received the 8th dan aikido from the Japanese Budo Federation in 1998 and has co-authored a book titled Zen and Aikido (ISBN 4-900586-13-7) with Shigeo Kamata.

Shimizu received the 'Foreign Minister Award', an award from the Foreign Minister of Japan, on 16 July 2002, for his work spreading aikido abroad. Shimizu-sensei was the first Aikido and Budo artist to receive this award. In the same year he was invited to the autumn garden party at the imperial palace in Akasaka, Tōkyō.
