= Tendu =

Tendu may refer to:

- Tendu, Indre, a commune in France
- Tendu Gewog, a village block in Bhutan
- Tendu, local name of the tree Diospyros melanoxylon (East Indian Ebony)
- Battement tendu, a dance or ballet movement
- Tendu, climbing technique
