= Yamagata Shinkansen =

High-speed railway line in Japan

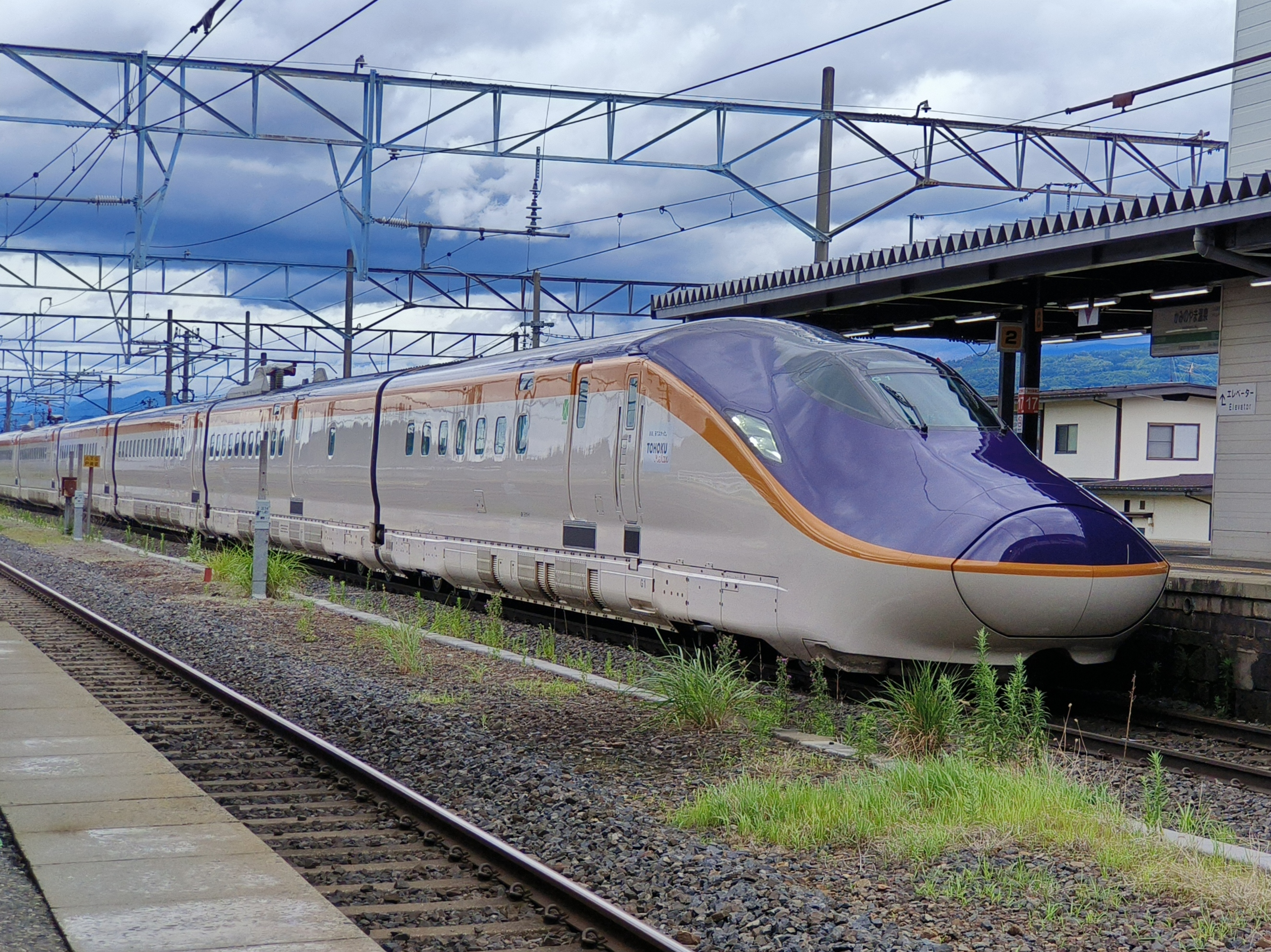
- E8 series set on a Tsubasa service at Kaminoyama-Onsen Station, June 2024

Overview
- Native name: 山形新幹線
- Status: Operational
- Owner: JR East
- Locale: Fukushima and Yamagata prefectures
- Termini: Shinjō; Fukushima (through service to Tokyo)
- Stations: 11
- Color on map: Orange

Service
- Type: Mini-Shinkansen
- Services: Tsubasa
- Operator: JR East
- Depot: Yamagata
- Rolling stock: E8 series

History
- Opened: July 1, 1992; 34 years ago

Technical
- Track length: 148.6 km (92.3 mi)
- Num of tracks: 2, 1 in some sections
- Track gauge: 1,435 mm (4 ft 8 1/2 in) standard gauge
- Electrification: Overhead line, 20 kV 50 Hz AC
- Operating speed: 130 km/h (81 mph)
- Maximum incline: 3.75%
Route map
Yamagata Shinkansen in blue, through service via the Tōhoku Shinkansen in red

The Yamagata Shinkansen (Japanese: 山形新幹線) is a mini-Shinkansen route in Japan, operated by East Japan Railway Company (JR East). It provides service between Tokyo and Shinjō in Yamagata Prefecture over the tracks of the Tōhoku Shinkansen and the Ōu Main Line.

The term Yamagata Shinkansen refers to the segment that connects Fukushima and Shinjō. Because the Shinkansen trains share tracks with local trains running on conventional lines it is often referred to as a "mini-Shinkansen".

== Operations ==
Trains consist of 7-car E8 series trainsets operating as Tsubasa services. Between Tokyo and Fukushima, most trains run coupled to Yamabiko limited-stop service trains on the Tōhoku Shinkansen. Between Fukushima and Shinjō, the trains run on their own at a maximum speed of 130 kilometres per hour (81 mph) and share the line with regular Ōu Main Line trains.

As of July 2012, about 62 million passengers had ridden the line since it opened in July 1992.

The fastest trains connect Tokyo and Yamagata stations in two hours and 29 minutes.

== Station list ==
Between Tokyo and Fukushima, the stations are the same as the Yamabiko service on the Tōhoku Shinkansen. Between Fukushima and Shinjō, the stations are as shown below. All stations are located on the Ōu Main Line.

Station	Distance in km (mi) from		Transfers	Location	
Station	Tokyo	Fukushima	Transfers	Location	
↑ Through service to/from Tokyo via the Tōhoku Shinkansen ↑
Fukushima 福島	272.8 (169.5)	0 (0)	Tōhoku Shinkansen (for Morioka); ■ Tōhoku Main Line; ■ Yamagata Line; ■ Iizaka Line; ■ Abukuma Express Line	Fukushima	Fukushima; Prefecture
Yonezawa 米沢	312.9 (194.4)	40.1 (24.9)	■ Yamagata Line; ■ Yonesaka Line	Yonezawa	Yamagata; Prefecture
Takahata 高畠	322.7 (200.5)	49.9 (31.0)	■ Yamagata Line	Takahata	Yamagata; Prefecture
Akayu 赤湯	328.9 (204.4)	56.1 (34.9)	■ Yamagata Line; ■ Flower Nagai Line	Nanyō	Yamagata; Prefecture
Kaminoyama-Onsen かみのやま温泉	347.8 (216.1)	75.0 (46.6)	■ Yamagata Line	Kaminoyama	Yamagata; Prefecture
Yamagata 山形	359.9 (223.6)	87.1 (54.1)	■ Yamagata Line	Yamagata	Yamagata; Prefecture
Tendō 天童	373.2 (231.9)	100.4 (62.4)	■ Yamagata Line	Tendō	Yamagata; Prefecture
Sakurambo-Higashine さくらんぼ東根	380.9 (236.7)	108.1 (67.2)	■ Yamagata Line	Higashine	Yamagata; Prefecture
Murayama 村山	386.3 (240.0)	113.5 (70.5)	■ Yamagata Line	Murayama	Yamagata; Prefecture
Ōishida 大石田	399.7 (248.4)	126.9 (78.9)	■ Yamagata Line	Ōishida	Yamagata; Prefecture
Shinjō 新庄	421.4 (261.8)	148.6 (92.3)	■ Yamagata Line; ■ Ōu Main Line; ■ Rikuu East Line; ■ Rikuu West Line	Shinjō	Yamagata; Prefecture

== Rolling stock ==
As of March 2024, the following types are used on Yamagata Shinkansen services.

- E8 series: 7-car sets, since 16 March 2024
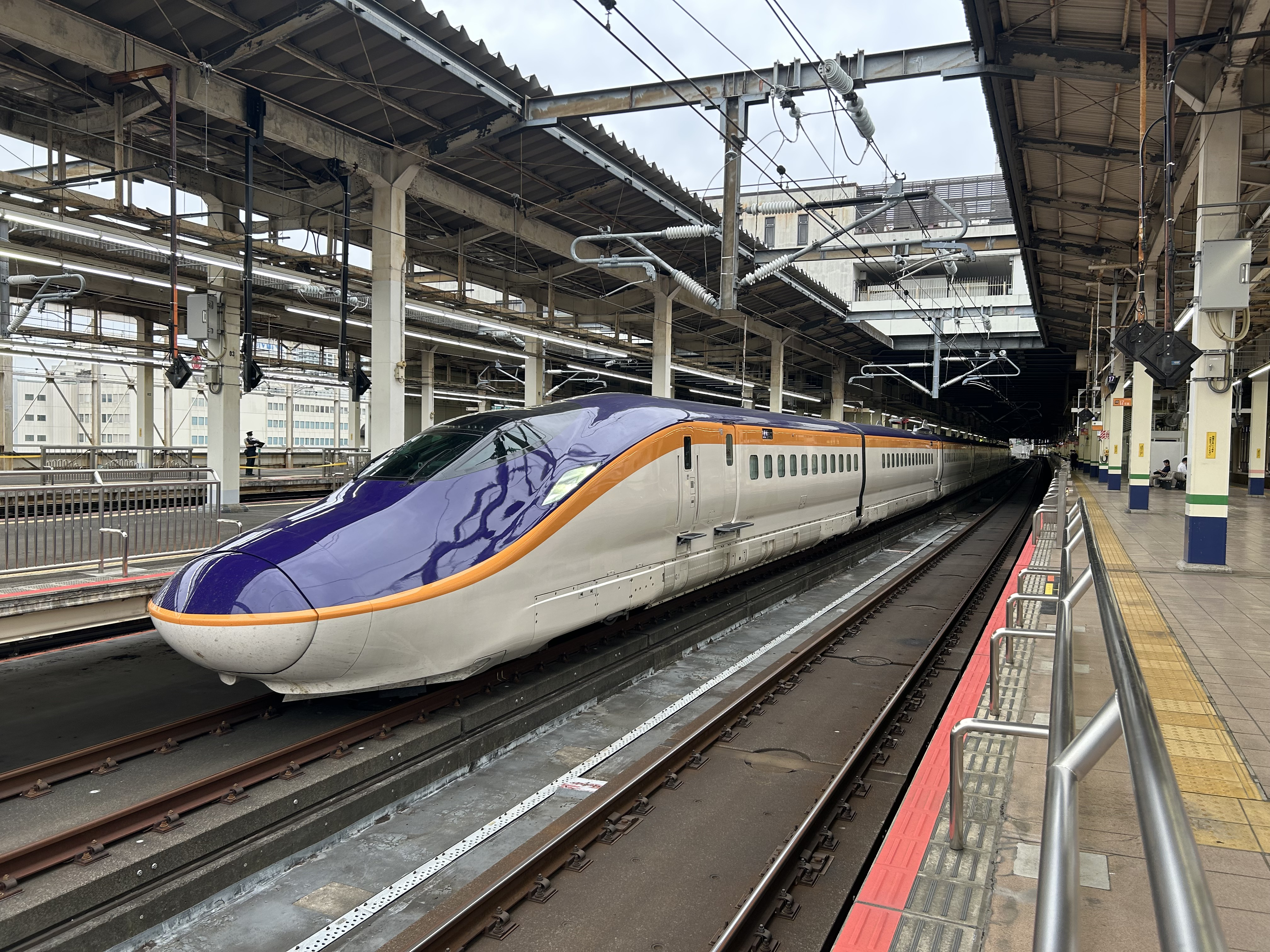
E8 series set

=== Former rolling stock ===
- 400 series: 7-car sets (originally 6-car sets) withdrawn by 18 April 2010
- E3-1000 series: 7-car sets, in service from 14 March 1999 until 18 March 2024
- E3-2000 series: 7-car sets, in service from 20 December 2008 until 25 December 2025.
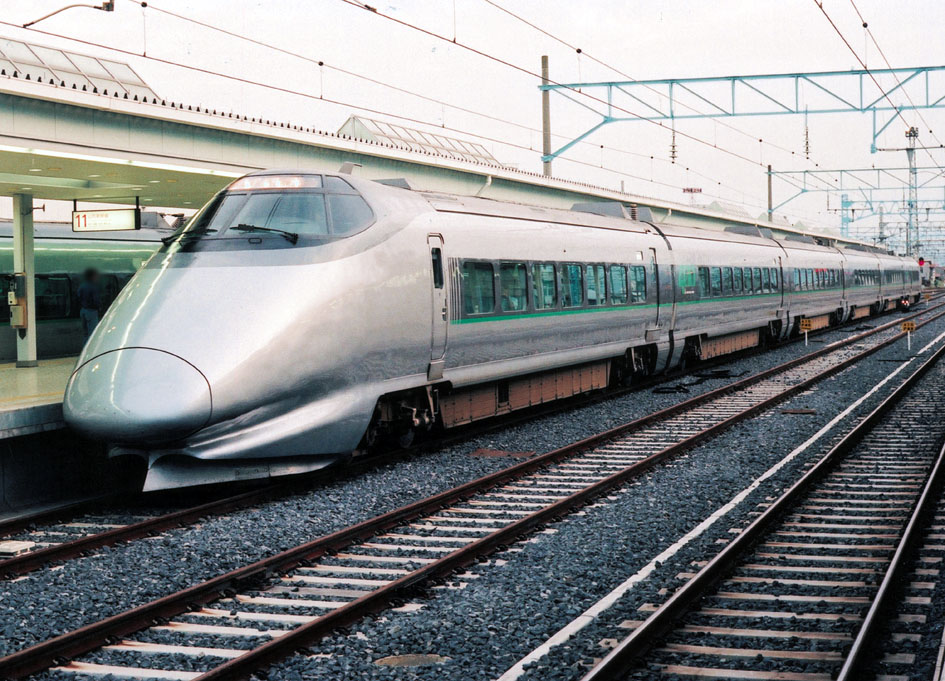
400 series, 6-car set in original livery

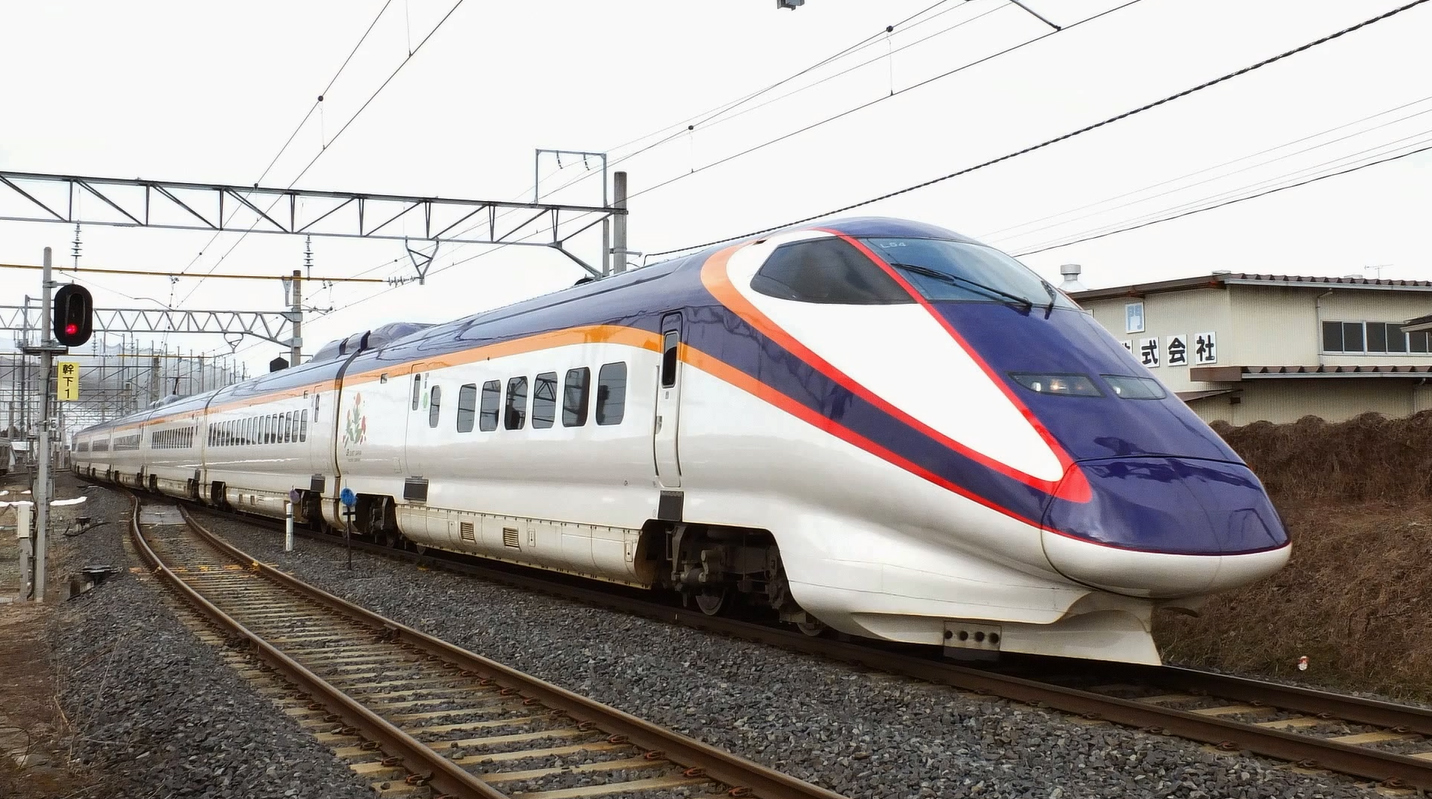
E3-1000 series set in new livery

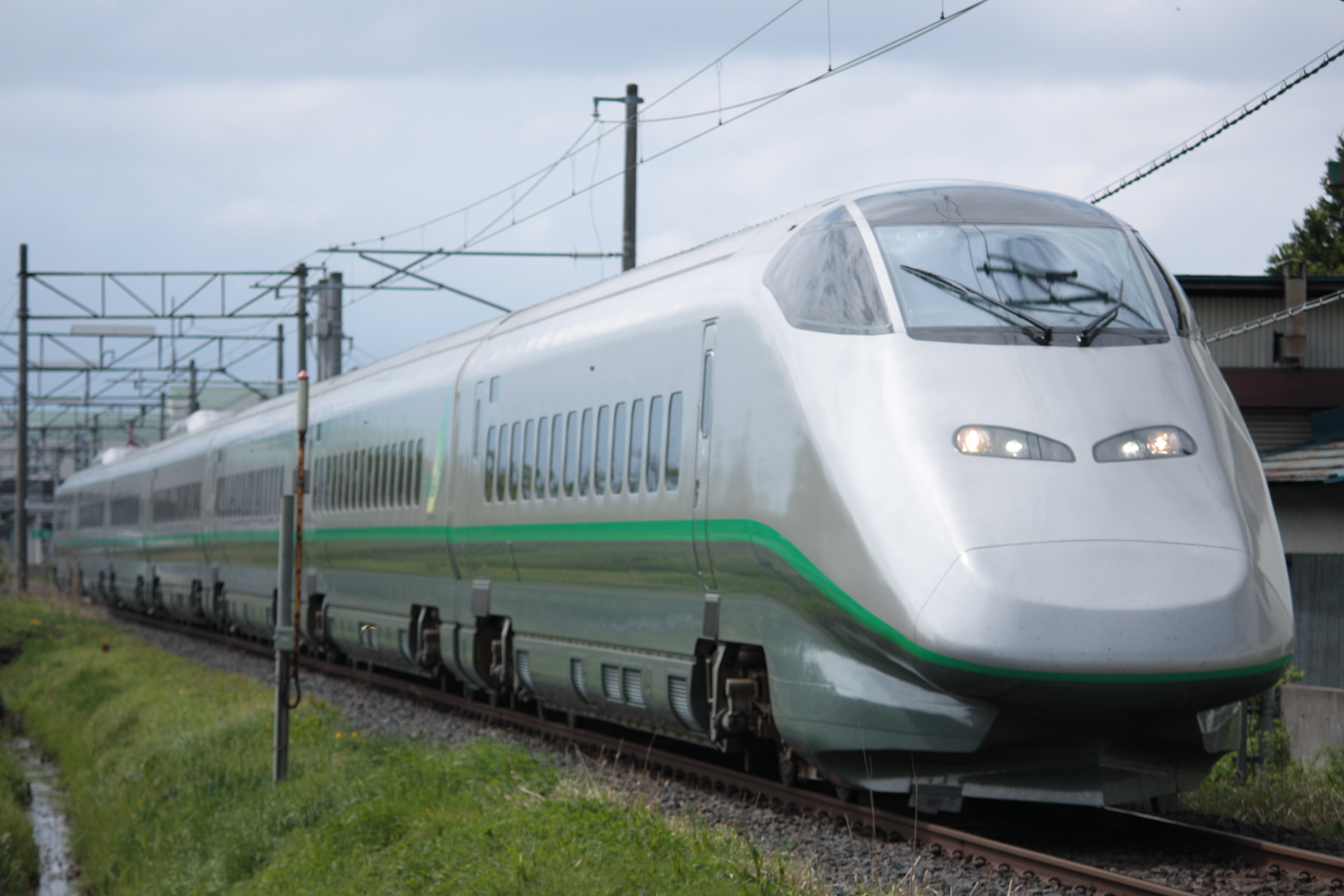
E3-2000 series set in original livery

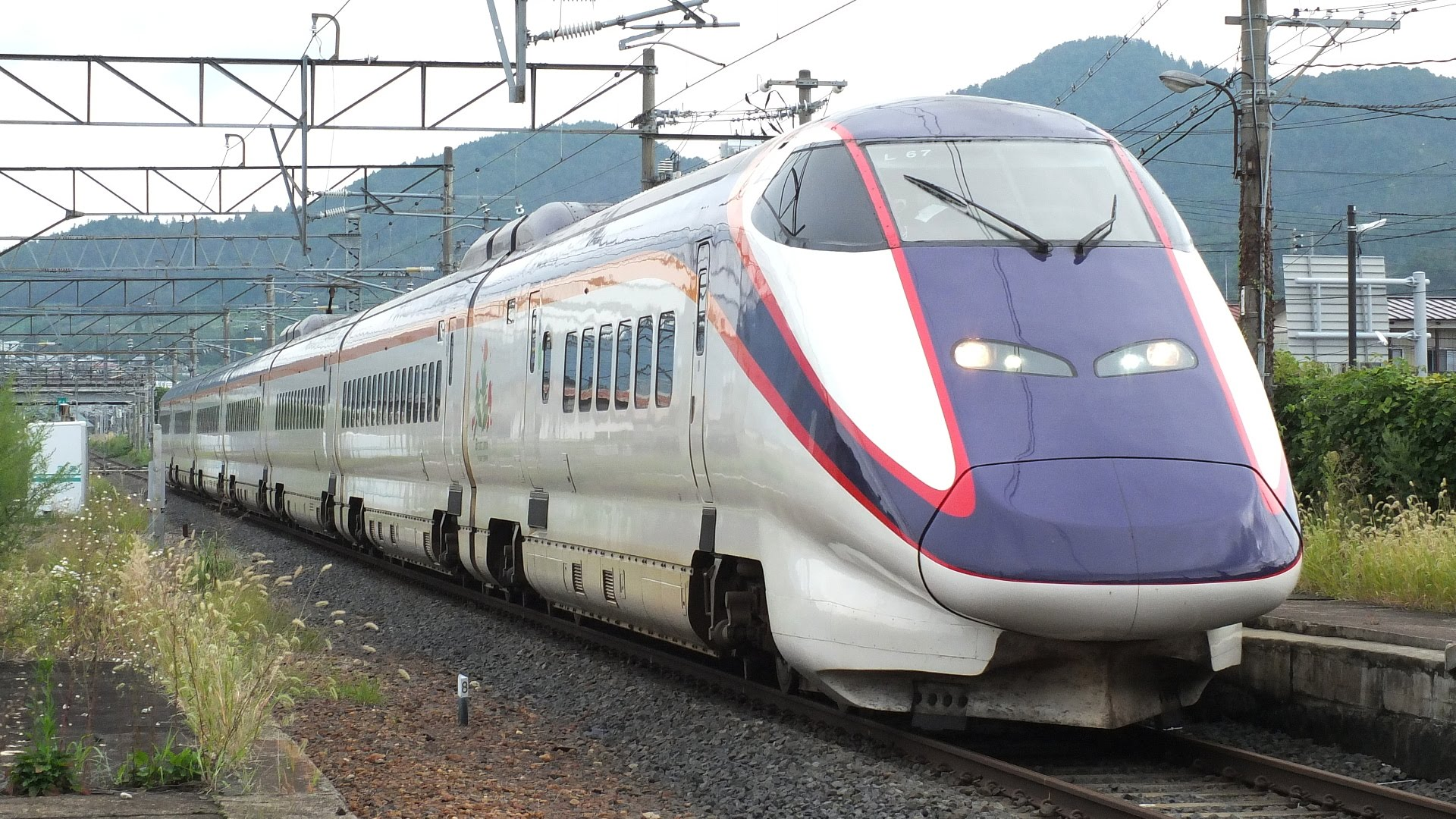
E3-2000 series set in new livery

=== Non-revenue-earning-types ===
- Class E926 "East i"
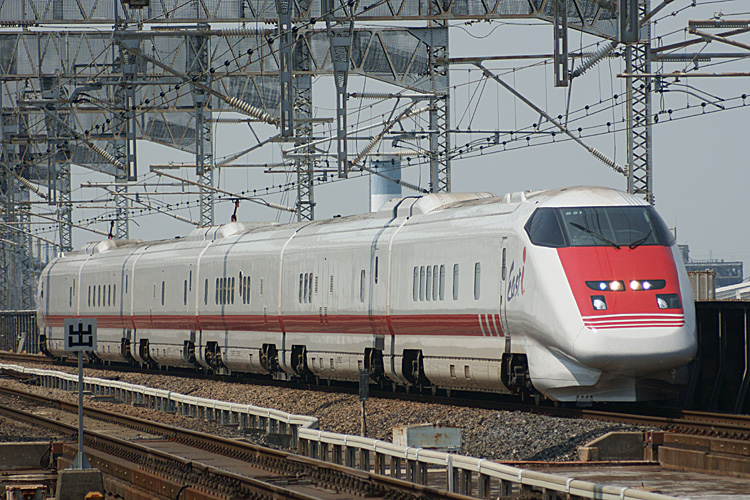
Class E926 "East i" train

== History ==
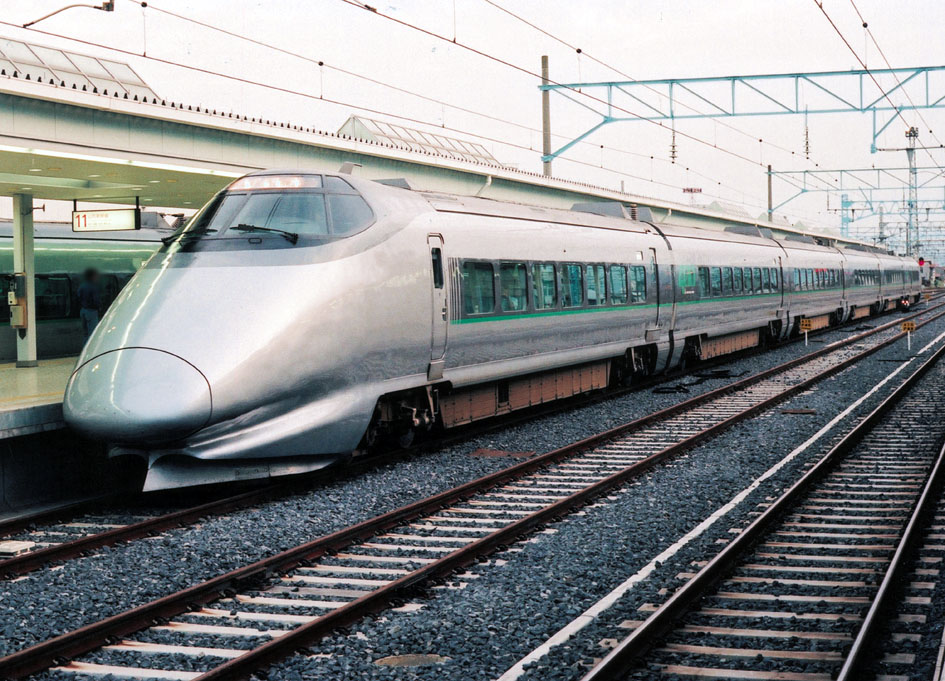
Six-car 400 series set in the original livery, shortly after the line's opening

The tracks of the Ōu Main Line were re-gauged between 1988 and 1992 to create the Yamagata Shinkansen. Tsubasa services began on 1 July 1992, operating between Tokyo and Yamagata using six-car 400 series trainsets coupled to 200 series trains on the Tōhoku Shinkansen between Tokyo and Fukushima. On 1 December 1995, the trains were lengthened to seven cars, and the line was subsequently extended northward to Shinjō on 4 December 1999. All cars were designated non-smoking from 18 March 2007.

A major rolling stock transition occurred on 20 December 2008, when E3-2000 series trainsets entered service, replacing the earlier 400 series, which were fully withdrawn on 18 April 2010. Operations were severely disrupted following the 2011 Tōhoku earthquake and tsunami on 11 March 2011, which led to the suspension of all services. Partial operations resumed between Fukushima and Shinjō on 31 March 2011, and full through-services between Tokyo and Shinjō were restored on 12 April 2011, albeit at approximately half of the previous capacity.

Services were disrupted on 13 February 2021, when operations north of Nasushiobara Station were suspended following the 2021 Fukushima earthquake.

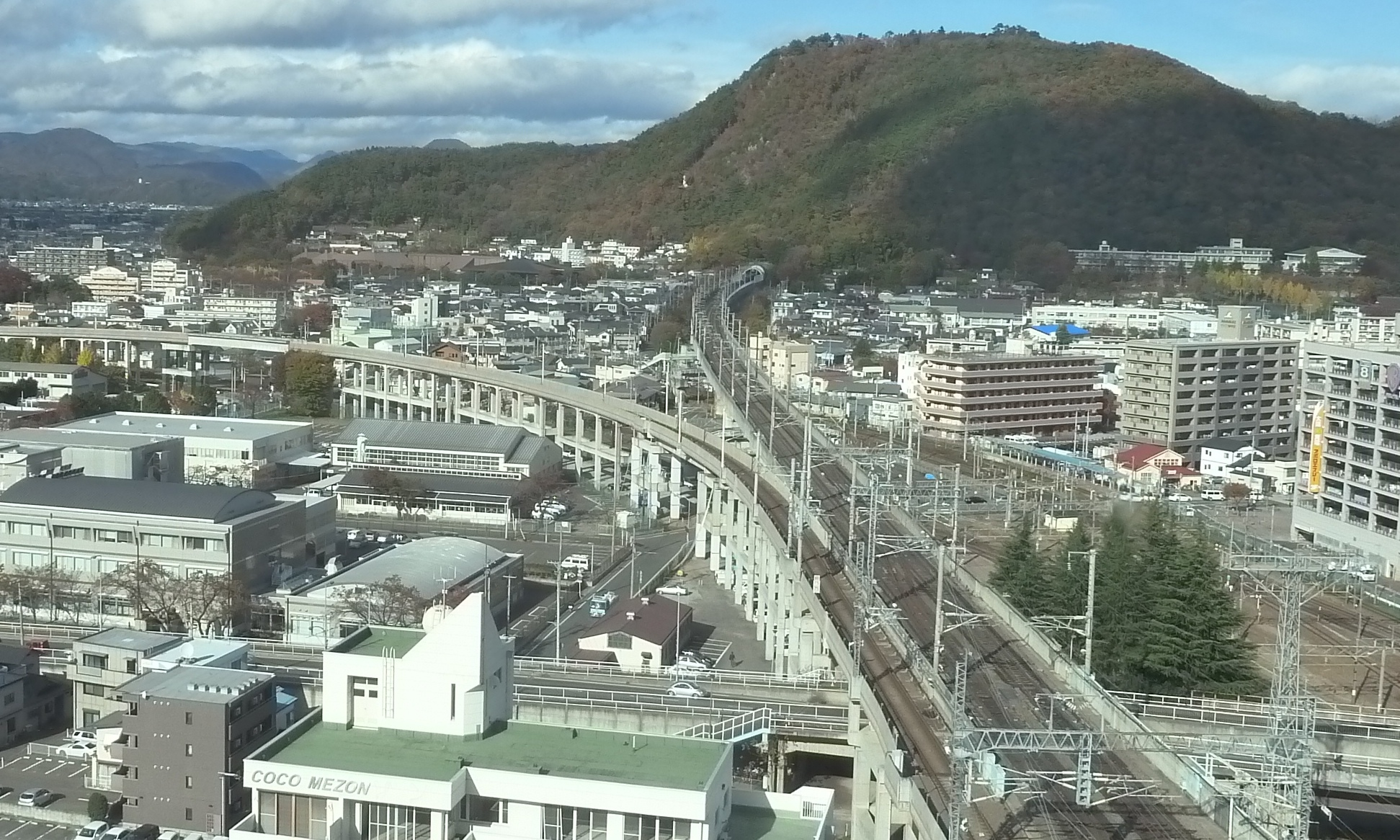
Aerial view of the Yamagata Shinkansen diverging (left) from the Tōhoku Shinkansen north of Fukushima Station

In March 2020, JR East announced two major projects to improve the line. The first was the introduction of the E8 series trains, designed to increase maximum speeds on the Tōhoku Shinkansen to 300 kilometres per hour (190 mph) and reflect the landscape and cultural identity of Yamagata Prefecture. Delivery began in 2023 and is scheduled to conclude in 2026, when the E8 series will replace the remaining E3 series. The second project is the construction of a new approach line at Fukushima Station to remove a bottleneck. Previously, southbound Yamabiko services coupling with Tsubasa trains had to cross the northbound main line twice to access Platform 14. The new track will branch from the Ōu Main Line, pass beneath the elevated Shinkansen, and connect directly to Platform 11, eliminating at-grade crossings and allowing simultaneous arrivals and departures, improving timetable flexibility. Completion is scheduled for 2026.

On 9 June 2022, the line celebrated its 30th anniversary; an E3 series trainset was wrapped in a commemorative livery and remained in service until November 2022.

The E8 series entered service on 16 March 2024. On 17 June 2025, four E8 series trainsets experienced auxiliary power unit (APU) malfunctions. The APU converts electricity collected from the overhead lines into the appropriate forms required by onboard systems, including traction motors and cooling equipment. Each trainset is equipped with two APUs to provide redundancy.

The E8 series entered service on 16 March 2024. On 17 June 2025, four E8 series trainsets suffered malfunctions of their auxiliary power units (APUs), which convert electricity from overhead lines for onboard systems. In one case, a trainset stopped on the Tōhoku Shinkansen, blocking the line, stranding passengers, cancelling 86 services, and delaying 138 others across the Tōhoku, Yamagata, and Akita Shinkansen lines. JR East suspended independent E8 operation, limiting them to multiple working and temporarily reinstating some E3 trains, reducing Yamagata Shinkansen service to roughly 80% of normal. Investigations found that an electrical issue, combined with high summer temperatures, caused protective components to fail, allowing excess current to reach and damage sensitive electronic systems. After installing stronger protective components and revising settings, independent operation and through services gradually resumed from 1 August 2025.

== Future ==
=== Proposed Ou base tunnel ===
JR East has proposed the construction of a base tunnel through the Ōu Mountains west of Fukushima, with a surveyed route between Niwasaka and Sekine. Of the proposed 24.9-kilometre (15.5 mi) line, 23.1 kilometres (14.4 mi) would be underground, located mostly north of the existing line, and follow a more direct alignment intended to reduce journey times by approximately 10 minutes through a proposed line speed of up to 200 kilometres per hour (120 mph). The tunnel would bypass the Itaya Toge pass, where gradients of 3.0–3.8% and an altitude of 548 metres (1,798 ft) currently limit speeds to 55 kilometres per hour (34 mph) or less and leave the line vulnerable to heavy rain, snow, and high winds; between 2011 and 2017, 410 Tsubasa services were delayed or suspended, 40% of which occurred on the Itaya Toge section. If authorized at an estimated cost of ¥150 billion, detailed design would take five years and construction a further 15 years, with an option to build the tunnel to the full Shinkansen loading gauge for an additional ¥12 billion.
