= Tsubasa (train) =

Japanese high-speed Shinkansen train service

- E8 series set on a Tsubasa service

Overview
- Service type: Shinkansen
- Locale: Japan
- First service: Limited express: 1 October 1961; Shinkansen: 1 July 1992
- Current operator: JR East
- Former operator: JNR

Route
- Termini: Tokyo; Shinjo
- Average journey time: 3 hours, 7 minutes
- Service frequency: 16 round trips daily
- Lines used: Tōhoku Shinkansen; Yamagata Shinkansen

On-board services
- Classes: Ordinary, Green
- Catering facilities: Trolley service

Technical
- Rolling stock: E3 and E8 series
- Track gauge: 1,435 mm (4 ft 8 1/2 in) standard gauge
- Electrification: Overhead line, 25 kV 50 Hz AC
- Operating speed: Tokyo–Fukushima: 300 km/h (190 mph); Fukushima–Shinjo: 130 km/h (81 mph)

The Tsubasa (Japanese: つばさ; lit. 'wing') is a high-speed Shinkansen train service operated on the Yamagata Shinkansen and Tōhoku Shinkansen by East Japan Railway Company (JR East) since July 1992. The name was formerly used for a limited express service operated by Japanese National Railways (JNR) and later by JR East, which ran from Ueno to Akita, and was discontinued in 1992 when the new Shinkansen service commenced.

== Service outline ==
The services were originally operated by 7-car 400 series trains, later replaced by 7-car E3 series trains. They couple with E2 series trains for their journey from Tokyo to Fukushima, traveling at a maximum speed of 275 km/h (170 mph). Tsubasa trains are limited to 130 km/h (80 mph) on the Yamagata Shinkansen from Fukushima to Shinjō since there are many sharp curves and level crossings, as the line is essentially a re-gauged narrow-gauge line.

Starting 16 March 2024, services are also operated by 7-car E8 series, gradually replacing E3 series in the future. They operate in conjunction with E5 series between Tokyo and Fukushima, increasing their maximum speed of 275 km/h (170 mph) to 300 km/h (185 mph).

== Train formations ==
Tsubasa services are operated by 7-car E3 series or E8 series sets, with car 11 at the Tokyo end. All seats are no-smoking.

Car No.	11	12	13	14	15	16	17
Accommodation	Green car	Reserved	Reserved	Reserved	Reserved	Non-reserved	Non-reserved
Facilities	Wheelchair space	Wheelchair space	Cardphone			Cardphone	

== Rolling stock ==
Tsubasa services are operated using a fleet of three E3-1000 series and twelve E3-2000 series 7-car trains. The latter were phased in from December 2008, totally replacing the older 400 series trains from April 2010.

The E8 series began operation on Tsubasa services on 16 March 2024.

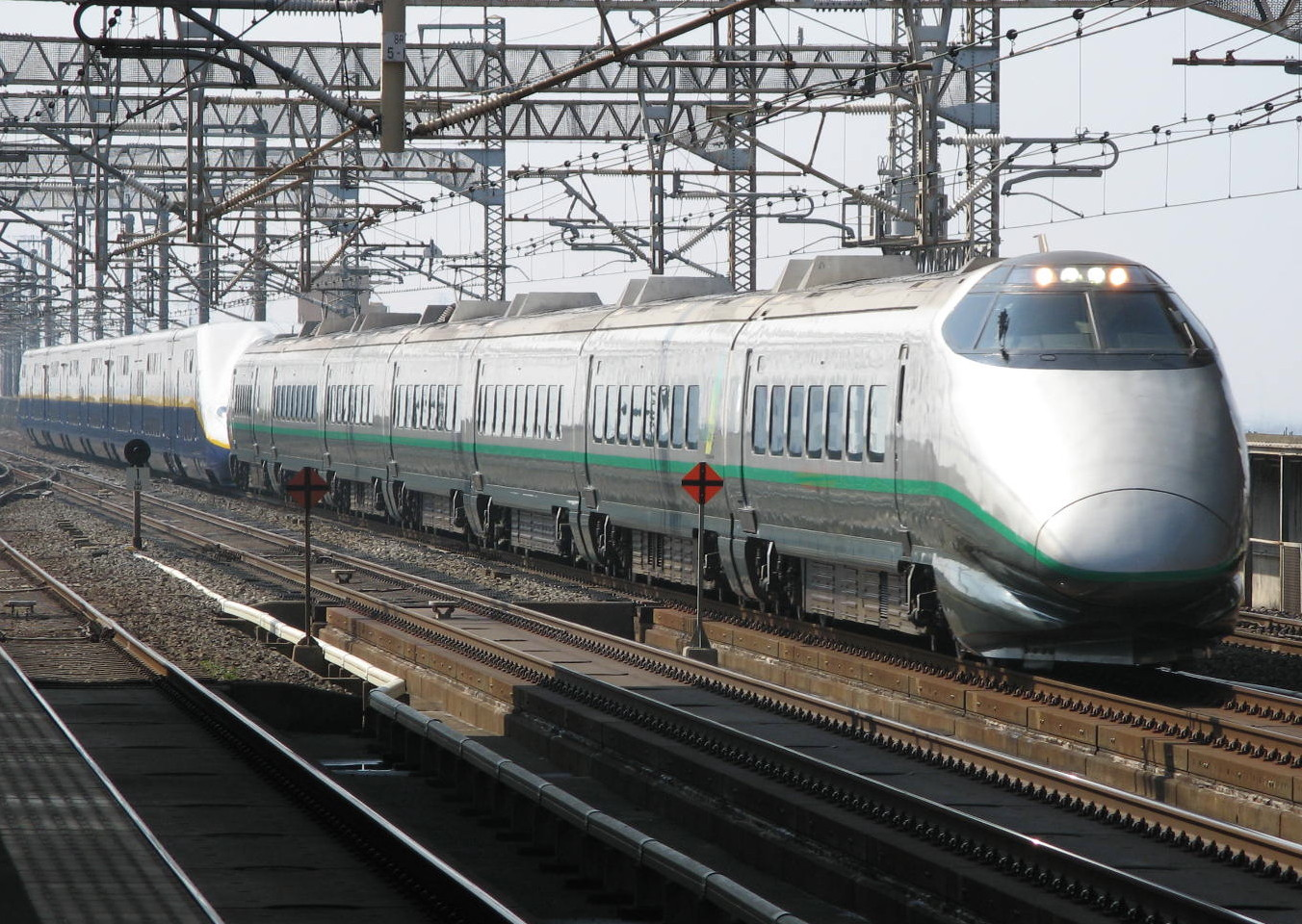
400 series, March 2008

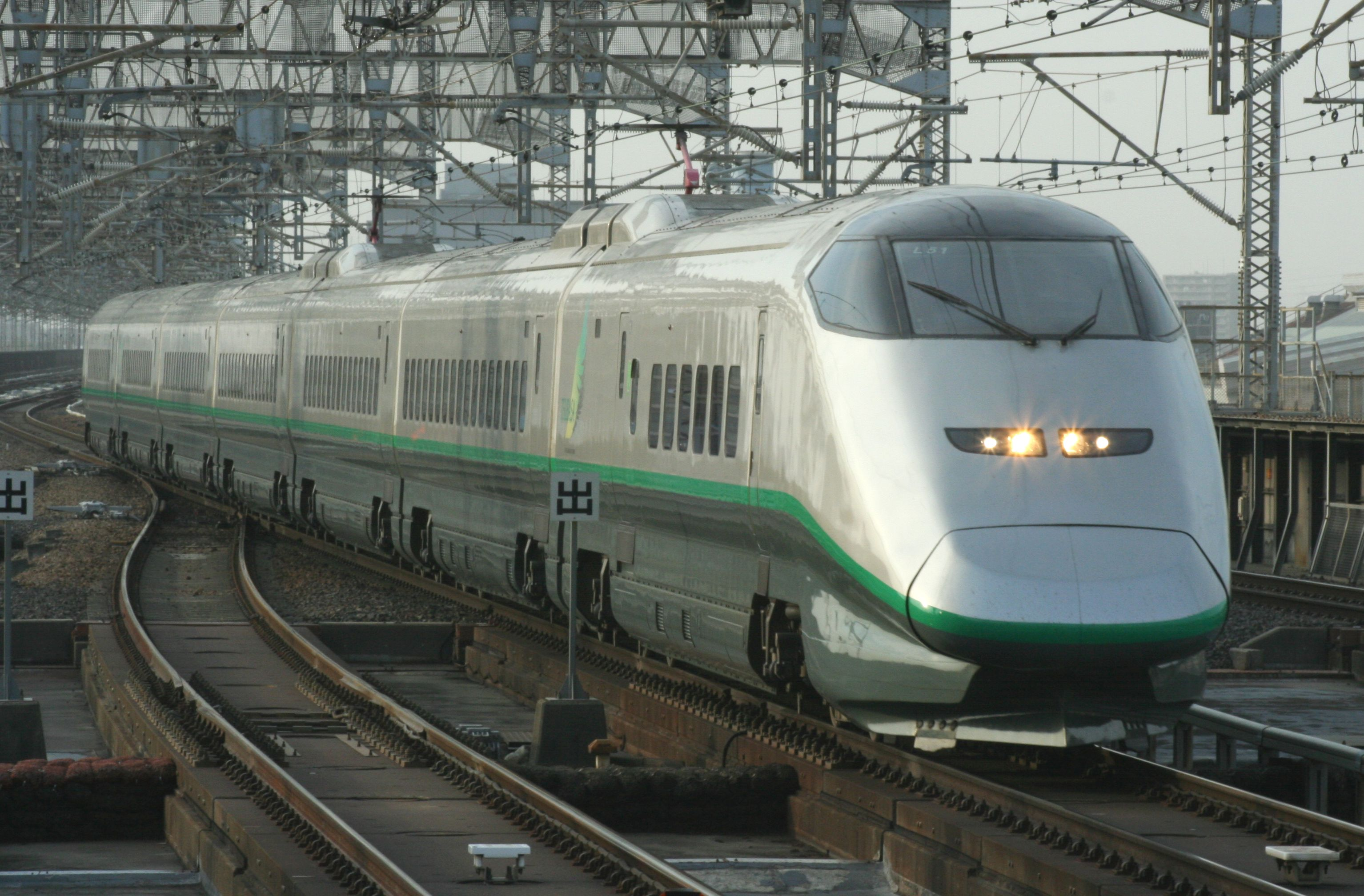
E3-1000 series, April 2011

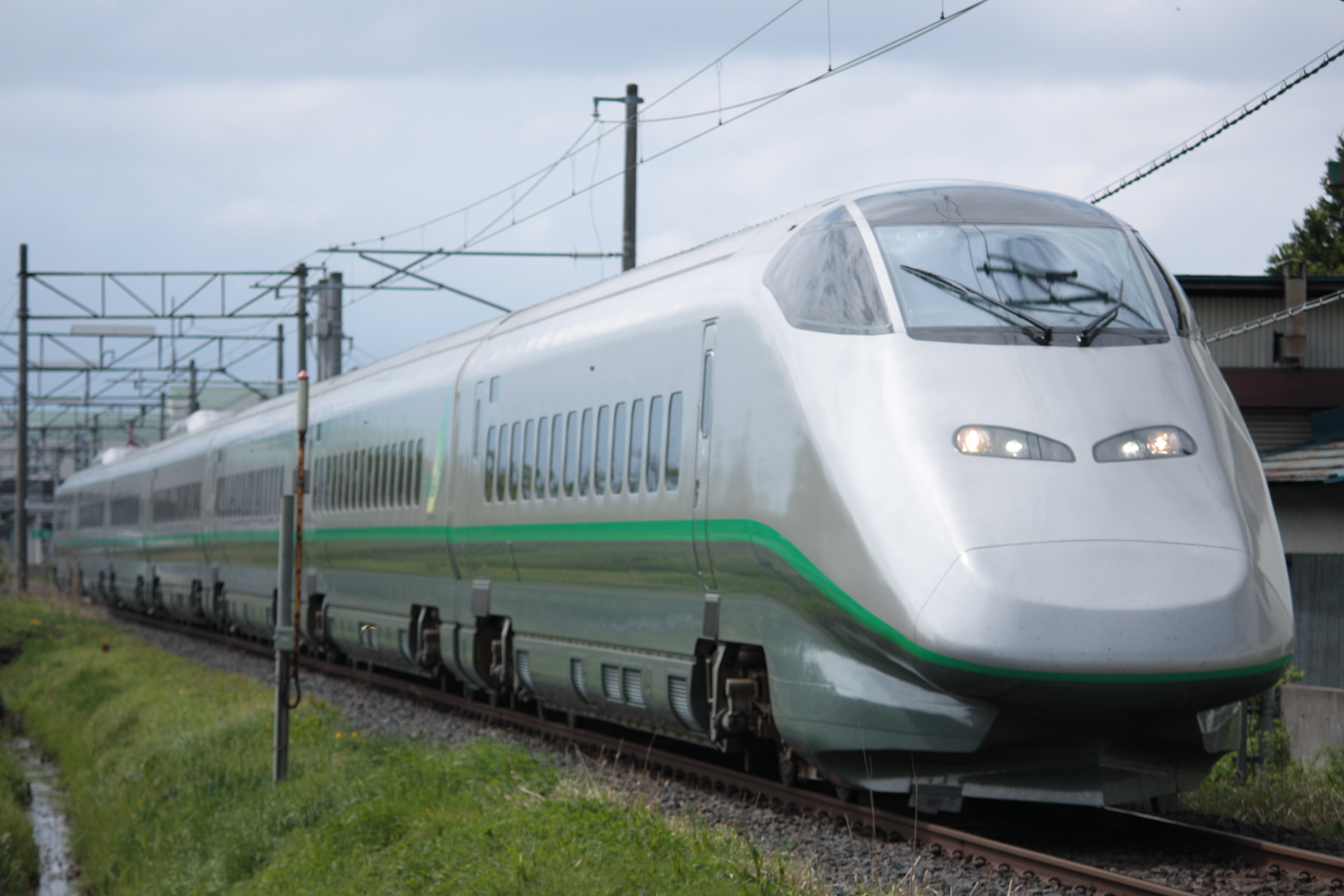
E3-2000 series, May 2009

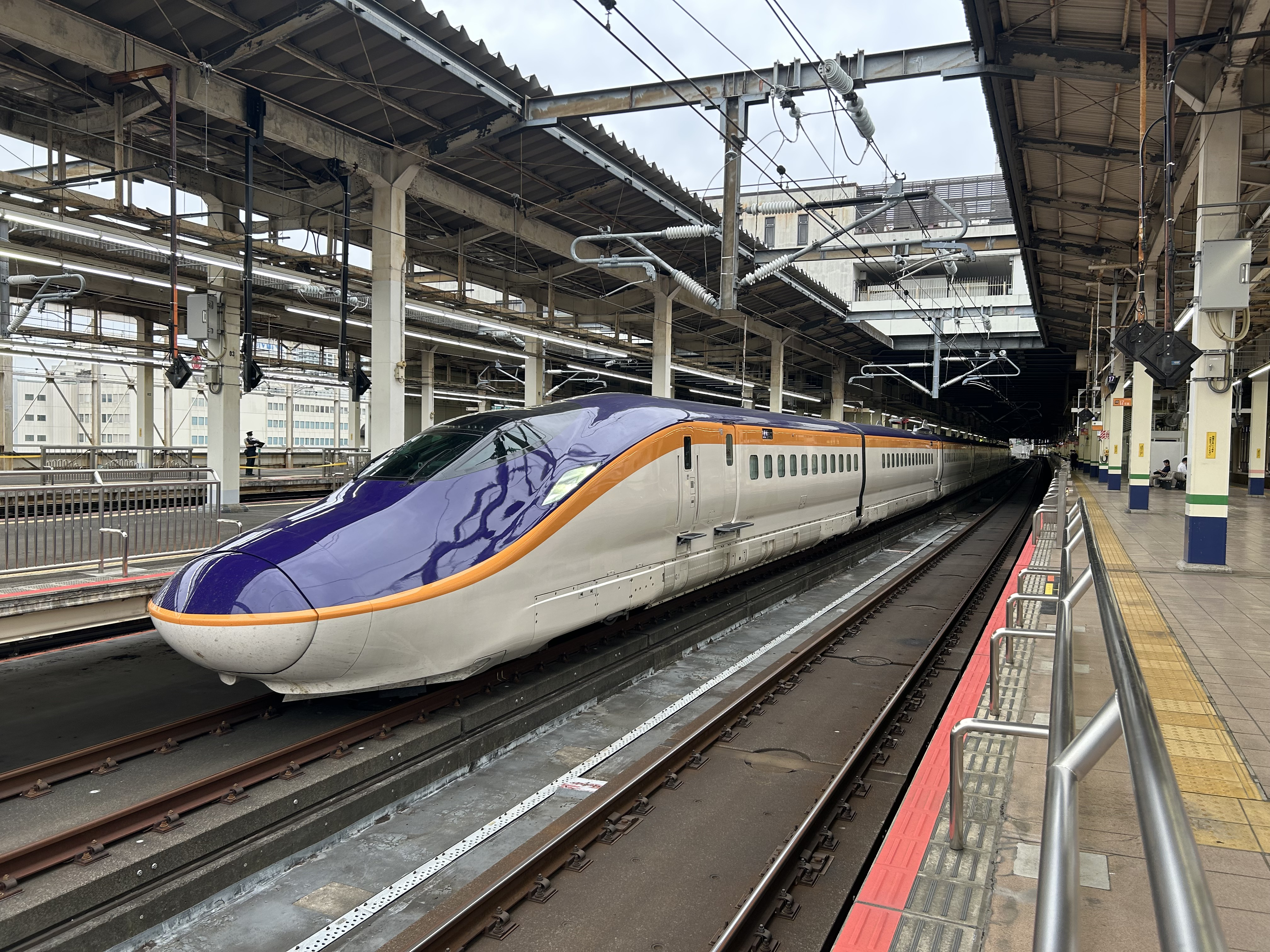
E8 series, July 2023

== History ==
=== Limited express service (1961–1992) ===
The Tsubasa service commenced from the start of the revised timetable on 1 October 1961 as a limited express operating between Ueno in Tokyo and Akita, using new KiHa 80 series diesel multiple unit (DMU) trains in 6-car formations. Initially, there was one return service daily, with a journey time of exactly 8 hours 30 minutes in either direction, cutting two hours off the journey time for the previous direct express service between Ueno and Akita. The outward service departed from Ueno at 12:30, arriving at Akita at 21:00. The return service departed from Akita at 08:10, arriving at Ueno at 16:40.

From April 1963, the trains were increased from 6 to 7 cars to cope with the popularity of the service, and from 5 December of the same year, an additional unit was added to the formation when running between Ueno and Morioka.

From the start of the October 1968 timetable revision, services were extended to run to and from Tokyo Station, and KiHa 81 driving cars formerly used on Hatsukari services were added to the formations.

In February 1970, the KiHa 80 series trains were replaced by KiHa 181 series 10-car DMU formations, which were capable of running at a maximum speed of 120 km/h on the main line. In July 1971, these formations were lengthened to 12 cars.

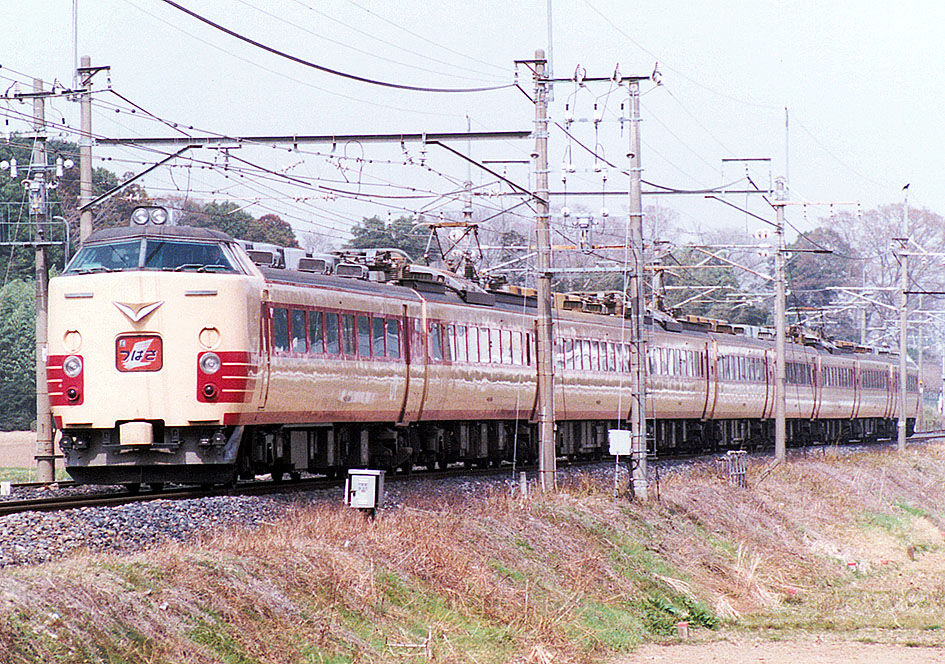
A 485 series EMU on a Tsubasa service, 1990

In October 1975, electrification of the Ou Main Line was completed, and from the start of the revised timetable on 25 November, the KiHa 181 series DMUs were replaced on Tsubasa services by 485 series electric multiple unit (EMU) trains. From the start of the revised timetable in October 1978, three return workings operated daily, with non-reserved cars also included for the first time.

Service patterns were revised following the opening of the Tohoku Shinkansen in November 1982. Service frequency was increased to five trains in each direction daily, but most services were cut back to operate between Fukushima and Akita, with only one down service and two up services remaining between Ueno and Akita.

=== Shinkansen service (1992–) ===
From 1 July 1992, the Tsubasa name was transferred to new high-speed shinkansen services operating between Ueno and Yamagata. Services used 6-car 400 series trains coupled to a 200 series on Tōhoku Shinkansen tracks between Tokyo and Fukushima. Initially, there were 14 return workings daily. From December 1993, all trains were extended to start and terminate at Tokyo Station, and in December 1994, service frequency was increased from 14 to 15 return workings daily.

From 1 December 1995, trains were extended to 7 cars.

From 4 December 1999, Tsubasa services were extended to Shinjō Station, with the fastest service (Tsubasa 113) taking 3 hours 5 minutes. Two new E3-1000 series sets (L51 and L52) were also added to the fleet.

From 21 September 2001, double-decker E4 series replaced the 200 series trains on the Tōhoku Shinkansen.

From 18 March 2007, all cars were made non-smoking.

From 20 December 2008, new E3-2000 series trains entered service, replacing 400 series trainsets. The last 400 series set (L3) in service was withdrawn on 18 April 2010.

From the start of the revised timetable on 17 March 2012, nine out of sixteen daily Tsubasa services are adjusted to operate coupled with Yamabiko services formed of E2 series trains, instead of E4 series sets, allowing the maximum speed to be raised from 240 to 275 km/h (149 to 171 mph) on the Tōhoku Shinkansen tracks, and shaving up to 6 minutes off journey times between Tokyo and Shinjō.

Since the start of the revised timetable on 29 September 2012, all sixteen daily Tsubasa services run coupled with E2 series Yamabiko trains, allowing the maximum speed of all services to be raised from 240 to 275 km/h (149 to 171 mph).

From spring 2014, the entire fleet of fifteen E3-1000 and E3-2000 series sets used on Tsubasa services were scheduled to be reliveried in a new colour scheme designed by industrial designer Ken Okuyama. Three sets were scheduled to be repainted by June 2014, with the entire fleet of fifteen sets repainted by mid 2016.

From the start of the revised timetable on 16 March 2024, E8 series sets were introduced on Tsubasa services, progressively replacing the existing E3 series sets and allowing the maximum top speed to be increased from 275 to 300 km/h (171 to 186 mph).

== See also ==
- List of named passenger trains of Japan
