= British Rail Class 395 =

High speed passenger trains built by Hitachi

British Rail Class 395 Javelin
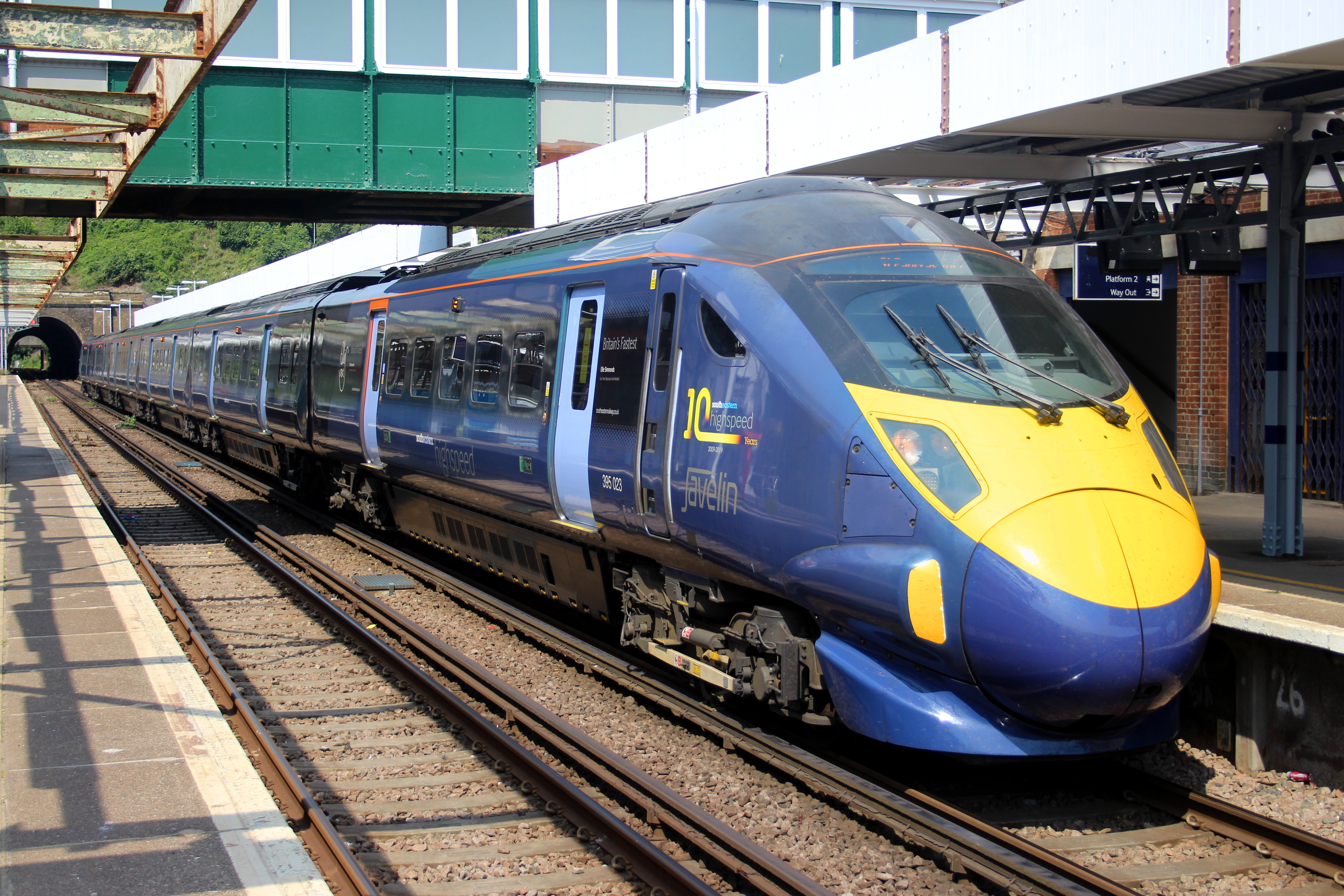
- A Class 395 at Dover Priory in 2020

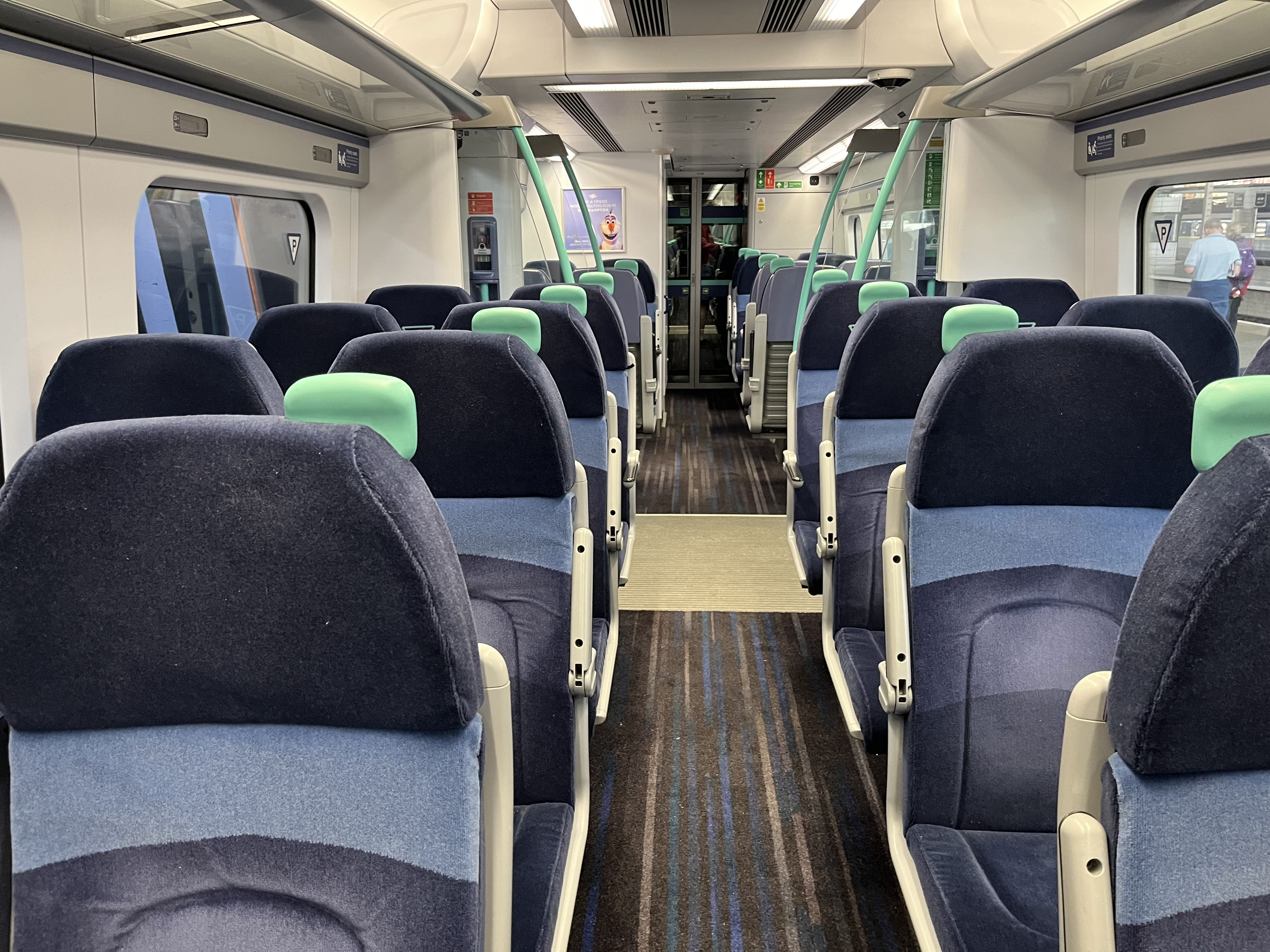
- The refurbished standard class interior of a Class 395
- In service: 2009–present
- Manufacturer: Hitachi Rail
- Built at: Kasado Works, Kudamatsu, Japan
- Family name: AT300
- Constructed: 2007–2009
- Entered service: 29 June 2009
- Number built: 29
- Number in service: 29
- Formation: 6 cars per unit: DPT-MS-MS-MS-MS-DPT
- Fleet numbers: 395001–395029
- Capacity: 340 seats, plus 12 tip-up
- Owner: Eversholt Rail Group
- Operator: Southeastern
- Depots: Ashford; Ramsgate
- Lines served: High Speed 1; Ashford to Ramsgate line; Chatham Main Line; Kent Coast Line; South Eastern Main Line; North Kent Line

Specifications
- Car body construction: Aluminium
- Train length: About 122 m (400 ft 3 in)
- Car length: DPT vehs.: 20.88 m (68 ft 6 in); Others: 20.00 m (65 ft 7 in)
- Width: 2.810 m (9 ft 2.6 in)
- Height: 3.817 m (12 ft 6.3 in)
- Floor height: 1.235 m (4 ft 0.6 in)
- Doors: Single-leaf sliding, each 1.12 m (3 ft 8 in) wide; (2 per side per car)
- Maximum speed: AC power: 140 mph (225 km/h); DC power: 100 mph (160 km/h)
- Weight: 265 tonnes (261 long tons; 292 short tons)
- Traction system: Hitachi IGBT-VVVF
- Traction motors: 16 × 210 kW (280 hp); (4 per MS car)
- Power output: 3,360 kW (4,510 hp)
- Acceleration: 0.7 m/s^{2} (1.6 mph/s)
- Deceleration: Normal: 0.9 m/s^{2} (2.0 mph/s); Maximum: 1.2 m/s^{2} (2.7 mph/s)
- Auxiliaries: 3 × 110 kVA; (3-phase 400 V AC + 110 V DC)
- Electric systems: 25 kV 50 Hz AC overhead; 750 V DC third rail
- Current collection: Pantograph (AC); Contact shoe (DC)
- UIC classification: 2′2′+Bo′Bo′+Bo′Bo′+Bo′Bo′+Bo′Bo′+2′2′
- Braking system: Electro-pneumatic
- Safety systems: AWS; KVB; TPWS; TVM-430
- Multiple working: Within class
- Track gauge: 1,435 mm (4 ft 8 1/2 in) standard gauge

Notes/references
- Sourced from except where noted

The British Rail Class 395 Javelin is a dual-voltage electric multiple-unit (EMU) passenger train built by Hitachi Rail as part of the Hitachi AT300 family for high-speed commuter services on High Speed 1 and elsewhere on the South Eastern franchise. The whole fleet is operated by Southeastern.

The Class 395 can operate at a maximum speed of 140 mph (225 km/h) under 25 kV AC overhead electrification on High Speed 1, and 100 mph (160 km/h) on 750 V DC third-rail supply on conventional lines. It is typically formed as a six-car train, although they can be rapidly coupled to one another to form a 12-car train as required. The type, which was entirely manufactured in Japan, is the first Hitachi-built rail vehicle to be sold to a European customer, as well as being the first British order for a Japanese train. The fleet was ordered in June 2005 by HSBC Rail, and was delivered to the UK between August 2007 and August 2009. Following the completion of 4,000 miles (6,400 km) fault-free running six months ahead of schedule, a 'preview' service was launched between London St Pancras and Ashford via Ebbsfleet on 18 June 2009. These were gradually expanded until the start of the full regular service on 13 December 2009.

The use of the high-speed trains as part of the transport infrastructure for the Olympic Park formed part of the original bid for the 2012 Summer Olympics. The service was named the Olympic Javelin, which formed the origin of the Javelin nickname. The Olympic services began 28 July 2012. Furthermore, the Class 395 has also been irregularly operated for charter services – though the first such uses did not happen until after the 2012 Olympics due to a lack of free units.

== History ==
=== Background ===
In December 2003, formal approval was given by the Strategic Rail Authority for domestic services to be run on the under-construction Channel Tunnel Rail Link (CTRL) in Kent, England, which has since been rebranded as High Speed 1 (HS1). Preliminary consultations for a new franchise including the envisioned 'CTRL Domestic' services along with new rolling stock for operating the said services, which were to begin in 2004. In 2005, the proposed high-speed services were combined with those from the former South Eastern rail franchise to form the Integrated Kent franchise (IKF).

In October 2004, Hitachi was announced as the preferred bidder to supply high-speed trains for HS1 services. During June 2005, a contract valued at £250 million was signed with Hitachi Europe to supply 28 units, with Eversholt Rail Group acting as the financier (ROSCO); at this point, the new fleet had an expected service date of 2009. In November 2005, the Department for Transport announced Govia as the new operator of the IKF.

The contract was Hitachi's first rail vehicle sold to a European customer. The company had previously worked with HSBC Rail and UK rail authorities between 2002 and 2003 to demonstrate that the company's traction system was suitable for use on the Great Britain rail network, including testing asynchronous AC motors and confirming electromagnetic compatibility, as part of a separate contract involving the upgrade of existing Class 465 and 466 EMUs. The contract was also the first British order for a Japanese train; as such, Hitachi viewed the deal as a key opportunity to establish itself in the UK market. Hitachi took the design from its 885 series A-train in particular. The design pedigree can be traced back to the 400 Series Shinkansen from 1992.

Construction of HS1 was complete in November 2007. By 2008, the initially planned 'CTRL Domestic' services (2003) from London St Pancras to Gravesend, and Canterbury West and Folkestone Central, via Ashford, had been expanded in scope to include services to the Medway Towns, East Kent and Dover. Furthermore, a 29th train was added to the order agreement by franchise holder Southeastern so as to provide additional capacity.

=== Maintenance depots and training ===
The contract for the trains included maintenance of the trains; according to Hitachi, the maintenance techniques and schedules of which being initially generated from experience of their Shinkansen cousins in Japan. Maintenance services are provided via a consortium, referred to as 'DEPCO', which included HSBC Rail (finance), Fitzpatrick Contractors Ltd (construction), RPS Burks Green (architects/civil engineers), EMCOR UK (mechanical and electrical plant) and GrantRail (trackwork) constructed a new maintenance depot building at Ashford and the updating of the existing depot site.

The new Ashford Depot was constructed on the site of the Ashford Down Yard Carriage Sidings, (Note: Coordinates 51.1419°N 0.8811°E) and formally opened on 2 October 2007. The facility included a five-track trainshed with bogie drop made by BBM and train lifting equipment from Mechan. A second building housed a wheel lathe from Sculfort. Other facilities included carriage washing plant, a 25 kV OHL test track, and sidings for rolling stock. The design and layout of the depot, which was optimised specifically for the Class 395, enables the most efficient workflow possible, including minimal complex shunting actions, physical minimisation wherever reasonable, and in line with modern data management practices.

A Class 395 train simulator supplied by Corys TESS was acquired for use at Southeastern's training centre in Ashford for driver training. Southeastern's co-parent company SNCF also assisted with high-speed driver training. The DEPCO consortium also updated Ramsgate train depot for the IKF with facilities including storage sidings for the Class 395 trains and light maintenance facilities.

=== Testing and preview service ===
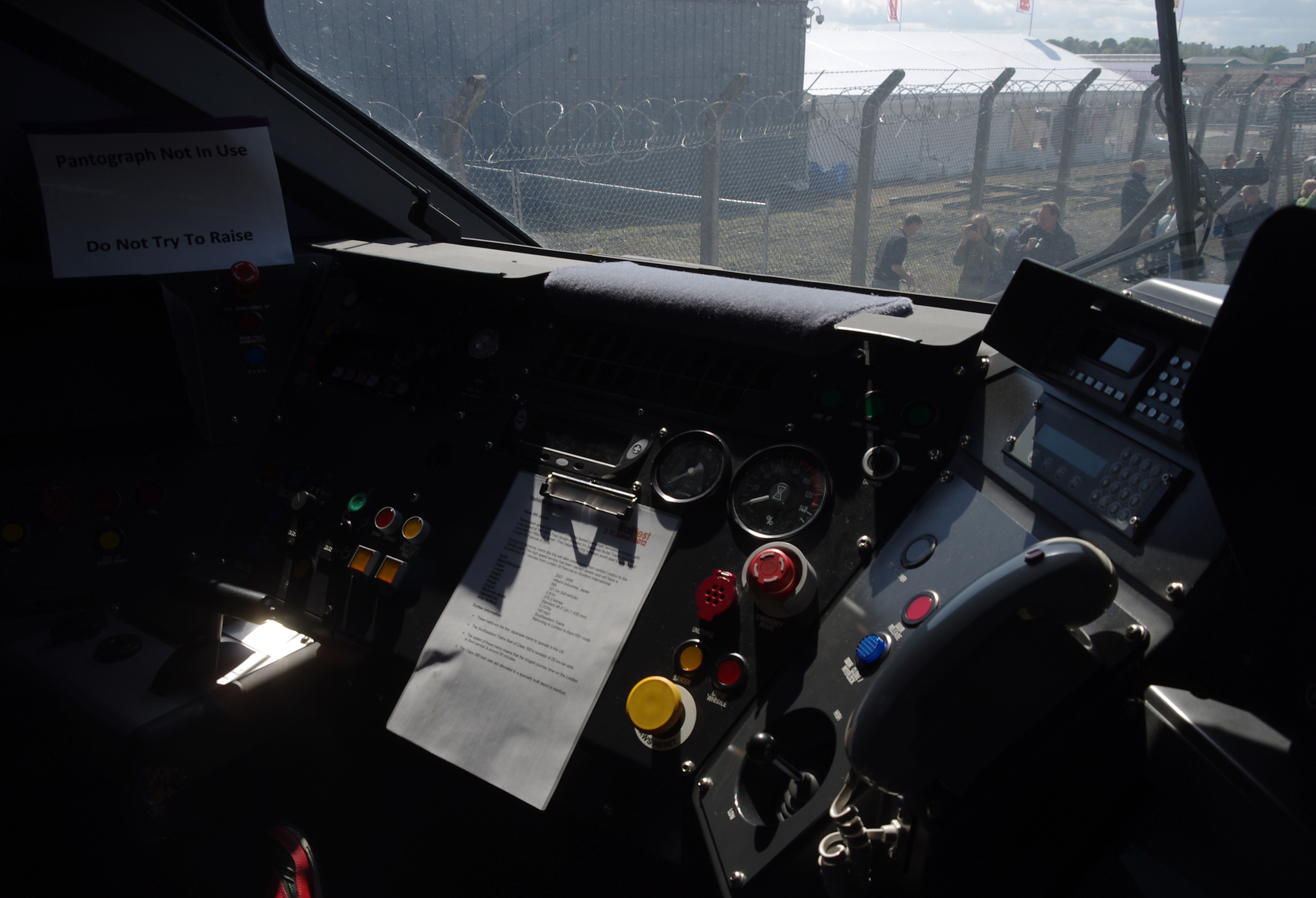
Cab interior on display at Railfest 2012

Pre-shipping factory tests included static and dynamic load tests, traction and braking tests, including tests on a 750 V DC third-rail system specially installed at Hitachi's test track. This round of manufacturer tests included the use of supercomputers to conduct both simulations and verification tests.

The first train was delivered from Japan to Southampton Docks on 23 August 2007. Days later, it was unveiled by Secretary of State for Transport Ruth Kelly at a media event held at Hitachi's new Ashford maintenance facility. Following the delivery of the first four units in March 2008, production was temporarily put on hold while these units were subjected to extensive UK-based testing. Homologation testing was undertaken by Serco. SNCF International assisted with testing of KVB and TVM 430 signalling systems, with speeds of 240 km/h (150 mph) attained in January 2008.

Following the successful completion of these tests, production and shipping of the main production tranche commenced in December 2008. Each train was required to demonstrate 5,000 mi (8,000 km) of fault-free operations prior to their acceptance by Southeastern. The final three trains arrived in the UK in August 2009, with the final train delivered to Southeastern on 11 December 2009.

The performance metric of 4,000 miles (6,400 km) fault-free running was achieved six months ahead of schedule, clearing the way for a 'preview' service to be offered between London St Pancras and Ashford via Ebbsfleet. On 18 June 2009, these were ceremonially launched by the Secretary of State for Transport Andrew Adonis, although the preview service only became available to general passengers on 29 June. The preview service allowed for further train testing under real-world conditions, during which the type reportedly achieved a 99% punctuality rate in the first month of operations. In September 2009, preliminary services were launched to the Kent coast (Dover via Folkestone, and Ramsgate via Canterbury). During November 2009, preview services commenced on the North Kent line as well.

Even during the preview service, the Class 395 presented several performance improvements in comparison to conventional rolling stock, including its high rate of acceleration, lower noise levels (primarily attributed to its air conditioning arrangements), and its aesthetic appeal. Railway journalist Richard Clinnick observed several minor shortcomings of the interior, such as the somewhat cramped seating arrangement and the lack of securing straps at the baby changing facility, but positively reviewed the overall package. In September 2010, it was reported that several passengers were concerned by the presence of a 'wobbling' motion that occurred within some tunnel sections; the phenomenon was described by Southeastern as non-dangerous, but all trains were fitted with dampers that prevent any recurrence of the issue.

== Operations and performance ==
Southeastern launched a "preview" service between Ashford and London Waterloo on 29 June 2009, with a full regular service commencing on 13 December 2009. Initial services included several half-hourly services. Seven million journeys were made in the first year of operation.

The North Kent service operated to and from St Pancras, London, via Stratford, Ebbsfleet, Gravesend, Strood, Rochester, Chatham, Gillingham, Rainham, and Sittingbourne to Faversham (later extended to Margate and Ramsgate).

The East Kent service operated through Stratford, Ebbsfleet, Ashford with one train continuing to Margate via Canterbury West, Ramsgate and Broadstairs, with the other to Dover via Folkestone West and Folkestone Central.

The introduction of the trains was generally successful, with good reliability and passenger satisfaction figures. The new high-speed services also caused an increase in passenger numbers above that already being experienced on the Kent network. On introduction, timetabled journeys to London from Ebbsfleet were reduced from 51 to 18 minutes, whilst trains using the entire length of High Speed 1 (starting in Ashford) had timetabled journeys reduced by around 45 minutes. However, the service has been criticised as being of limited use to many London commuters because trains terminate at St Pancras. Additionally, the change in service patterns to accommodate high-speed trains resulted in some non-high-speed services in Kent becoming slower.

In May 2011, a limited service from Maidstone West via Strood and Gravesend started, followed in September 2011 by a limited service from Sandwich via Deal to London St Pancras (partially subsidised by Kent County Council). In 2013, four years after the service started, total passenger numbers were ten million and punctuality was 92.6% (compared to 90.1% nationwide).

== Design ==
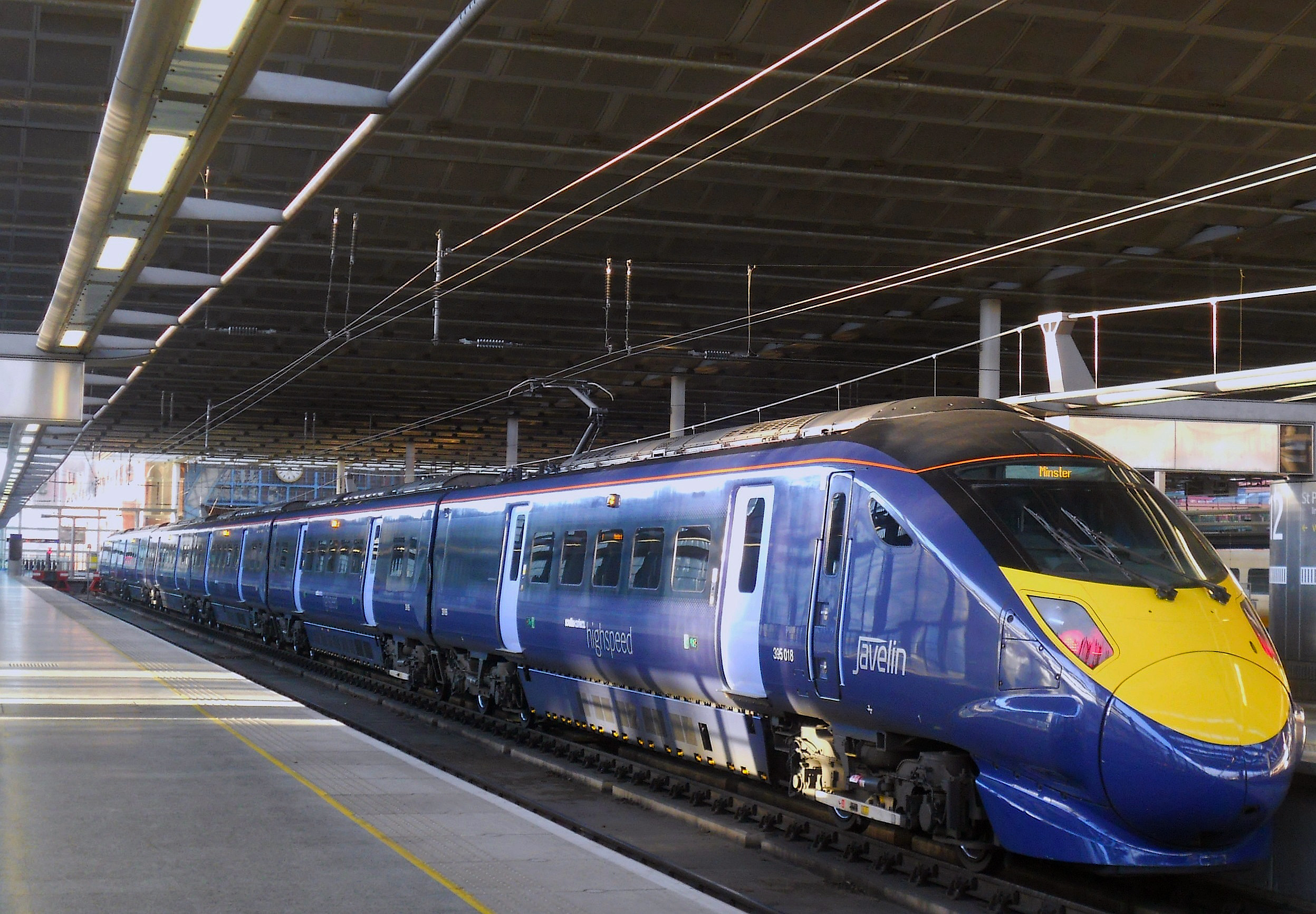
Class 395 at St Pancras International

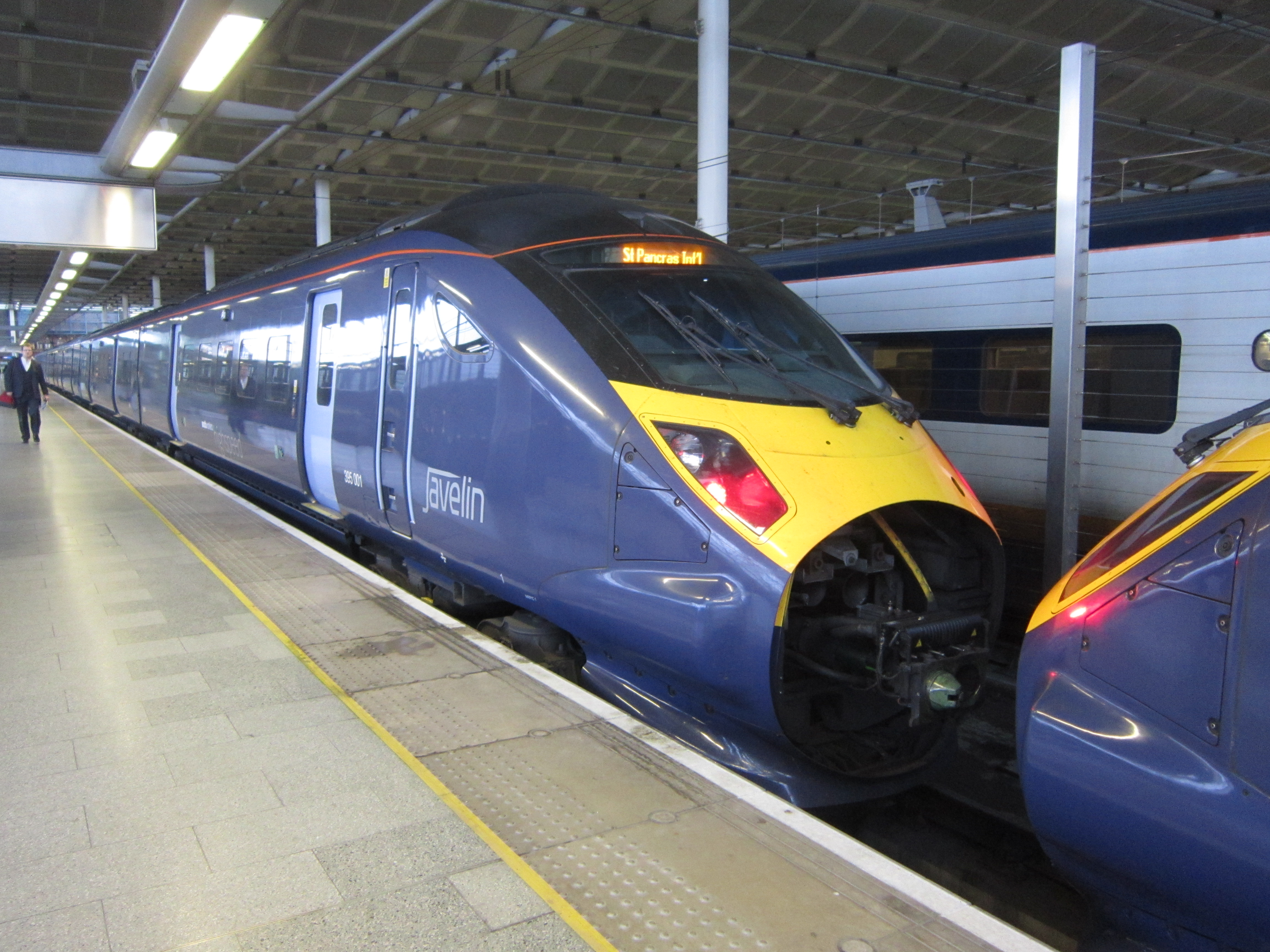
A unit with the nosecone opened and coupler visible

The 400 Series Mini Shinkansen and Hitachi's A Train design form the basis of the Class 395 design. From the 400 Series the class inherits the same six-car trains with 20-metre (65 ft 7 in) carriages, but with two doors per side placed one-third and two-thirds along the carriage instead. (Note: This layout, often used for commuter trains, was selected in order to fulfil requirements that the train have a maximum station dwell time not exceeding 90 seconds.) Both types of train are designed for operations at high speed on newly built lines, as well as at lower speed on conventional legacy lines. Unlike the steel-bodied 400 Series, the Class 395 has its carbody (walls, roof, floor) formed from friction stir welded (FSW) double-walled hollow extruded aluminium body panels, a technology that Hitachi Rail considers to be a part of its A-Train train family specification. The manufacturer claims that the FSW approach achieves minimal strain while providing a lightweight and high strength carbody in comparison to conventional techniques.

Each Class 395 unit contains six cars, formed DPT1-MS1-MS2-MS3-MS4-DPT2. (Note: where DPT is the Driver's cab, Pantograph, Trailer car; MS is the Motor car, Standard class (open saloon). Some sources refer to the cars as DPTSO (Driver's cab, Pantograph, Trailer car, Second class, Open saloon) and MSO (Motor car, Second class, Open saloon) respectively.) The intermediate cars carry the traction motors - one at each axle - while the unpowered outer cars carry the pantographs. The bogies are bolsterless, with both powered and unpowered bogies sharing a common design to simplify maintenance. Each six-car unit can work in multiple with another to create 12-car trains. The coupling process is automated and has been designed to take less than 60 seconds.

The propulsion system of the Class 395 comprises 16 electric motors each rated to produce 210 kW (280 hp) that work in conjunction with four IGBT converter/inverter units. In combination with its braking system, it can achieve a peak acceleration rate of 0.7 m/s^{2} (2.3 ft/s^{2}) and a normal maximum deceleration rate of 0.9 m/s^{2} (3.0 ft/s^{2}), although the latter can be elevated to 1.2 m/s^{2} (3.9 ft/s^{2}) under emergency circumstances. The train uses an electrically operated air brake system, supplied by Faiveley. Approximately 40% of the train's components were sourced from suppliers within the European Union.

Each six-car train is fitted with 340 seats in 2+2 formation, all standard class, with an additional twelve tip-up priority seats located in an indicated wheelchair area near the vestibules of the DPT1 vehicle. There is no separation between the vestibules and the main interior save for wind shields. There are two toilets per unit, one of which is larger and designed to be universally accessible. The seats are mostly arranged 'airline' style, though there are also a small number of table seats present in each car. Nearly all seats feature flip-down tables and coat hooks, while a single electrical socket has been provided for each pair of seats. The interior design and layout is in conformance with the Rail Vehicle Accessibility Regulations 2010.

The trains meet UK Railway Group Standards (RGS), and European Union Technical Specifications for Interoperability (TSI) standards for crashworthiness, and UK or EU standards for structure-load-bearing behaviour, material strength, aerodynamics, noise and fire resistance. Key areas of the train's design that were heavily influenced by these standards were its fireproofing measures and crashworthiness approach, which Hitachi observed to bear considerable differences with their corresponding Japanese standards. In addition to the applicable standards, the Class 395 was greatly shaped by the various criteria specified by the customer. Wherever it has been beneficial to do so, the various technologies and new approaches developed for the type have been incorporated by Hitachi back into its main product lines.

Each train is equipped with a computer-based Train Management System (TMS), which incorporates numerous monitoring systems, communications, environmental controls, and enables the train crew to control various onboard systems, including Selective Door Operation (SDO). The TMS features considerable redundancy, which has enabled it to obtain a SIL 2 safety certification. The SDO system uses a combination of GPS and train speed integration to estimate its position and identify the station at which the train has stopped, simplifying the correct door selection sequence. For reliability, passenger doors use a relatively simple sliding pneumatic system that has already been in use for several decades on Shinkansen trains.

As of 2023, the fleet is currently being refurbished at a cost of £27 million. New carpets, lighting, customer information and digital media screens and USB sockets are being installed. Panels and seat grab handles are being repainted and seat covers are being replaced.

== Named units ==
In September 2009, Southeastern named 12 Class 395's after Dame Kelly Holmes, whose name had previously been given to the mockup train, and eleven other Olympic and Paralymic medallists selected by public vote: Jamie Staff, Steve Backley, Sir Steve Redgrave, Rebecca Adlington, Sir Chris Hoy, Ben Ainslie, Daley Thompson, Duncan Goodhew, Katherine Grainger, Lord Sebastian Coe, and Dame Tanni Grey-Thompson.

Following the 2012 Olympics and Paralympics, Southeastern announced in February 2013 that another 12 units would be named after members of Team GB following a vote among its employees. The selected names were Alistair Brownlee, Ed Clancy, Hannah Cockroft, Jessica Ennis, Mo Farah, Jason Kenny, Jonnie Peacock, Victoria Pendleton, Ellie Simmonds, Dame Sarah Storey, Laura Trott, and David Weir.

Some units have subsequently received non-athlete names, including 5 names for the centenary of the First World War.

Unit	Date	Name	Ref
395001	September 2009	Dame Kelly Holmes	
395002	September 2009	Sebastian Coe	
395003	September 2009	Sir Steve Redgrave	
395004	September 2009	Sir Chris Hoy	
395005	September 2009	Dame Tanni Grey-Thompson	
395006	September 2009	Daley Thompson	
395007	September 2009	Steve Backley	
395008	September 2009	Ben Ainslie	
395009	September 2009	Rebecca Adlington	
395010	September 2009	Duncan Goodhew	
395011	September 2009	Katherine Grainger	
395012	July 2018	#trainbow	
395013	June 2019	Hornby Visitor Centre	
395014	2014	The Victoria Cross MMXIV	
395014	November 2018	Dina Asher-Smith	
395015	2015	Live On	
395015	2019	Southeastern Highspeed 10 Years 2009–2019	
395015	2025	Railway 200	
395016	September 2009	Jamie Staff	
395016	2016	Somme 100	
395017	February 2013	Dame Sarah Storey	
395017	September 2019	The Passchendaele Javelin	
395018	February 2013	Mo Farah	
395018		The Victory Javelin	
395019	February 2013	Jessica Ennis	
395020	February 2013	Jason Kenny	
395021	February 2013	Ed Clancy MBE	
395022	February 2013	Alistair Brownlee	
395023	February 2013	Ellie Simmonds	
395024	February 2013	Jonnie Peacock	
395025	February 2013	Victoria Pendleton	
395026	Before February 2013	Marc Woods	
395027	February 2013	Hannah Cockroft	
395028	February 2013	Dame Laura Kenny	
395029	February 2013	David Weir	

== Fleet details ==
Class	Image	Power	Operator	Brand	Quantity	Top speed		Cars per unit	Year built	Refs
Class	Image	Power	Operator	Brand	Quantity	mph	kph	Cars per unit	Year built	Refs
395		EMU	Southeastern	Javelin	29 (Note: Unit numbers 395001–395029)	140	225	6	2007–2009	

== Accidents ==
- In March 2013, 395001 was damaged in a buffer stop overshoot at Ramsgate Depot.
- At 3pm on 23 October 2017, 395008 (heading towards London St Pancras) struck a delivery van on a level crossing near Teynham between Faversham and Sittingbourne.
- On 28 November 2024, 395008 overran a bufferstop and derailed at Ramsgate Maintenance Depot.

== Model railways ==
In 2009 Hornby Railways launched two model versions of the BR Class 395, a super detailed model, and a basic representation of the prototype as part of their Railroad range both in South Eastern Blue livery and in 2012 Hornby released a special Olympic Games Livery in both super detail and basic in OO gauge. In 2025 as part of the Railway 200 campaign, Hornby released a new version of the BR Class 395 with a Railway 200 livery.

== See also ==
- List of high-speed trains
- JR Kyushu 885 series – another member of the Hitachi A-train family
