= Fastech 360 =

Japanese experimental high speed trains

Fastech 360 is the name given to a pair of former experimental high-speed EMU trainsets developed by East Japan Railway Company (JR East) to test technology for the next-generation Shinkansen rolling stock. The name is a portmanteau of Fast, Technology, and 360 km/h (360 km/h or 225 mph), the target operational speed for production trains based on the new technologies. Speeds of up to 405 km/h (250 mph) were targeted during performance testing. Results of testing using these trains was incorporated into the E5 series and E6 series trains, entering revenue service from 2011, eventually operating at 320 km/h (200 mph).

There were 2 trains:

- Class E954 Fastech 360S: 8-car set for use on shinkansen tracks only
- Class E955 Fastech 360Z: 6-car set for use on both shinkansen and Mini-shinkansen lines

Fastech 360 trains were equipped with emergency air braking plates like that of an aircraft, similar in appearance to the ears of a cat. This trait earned them a nickname of Nekomimi Shinkansen (猫耳新幹線), which literally means "cat-eared Shinkansen". This technology was not incorporated in the subsequent E5 series or E6 series trains.

== Class E954 Fastech 360S ==
Class E954 "Fastech 360S"
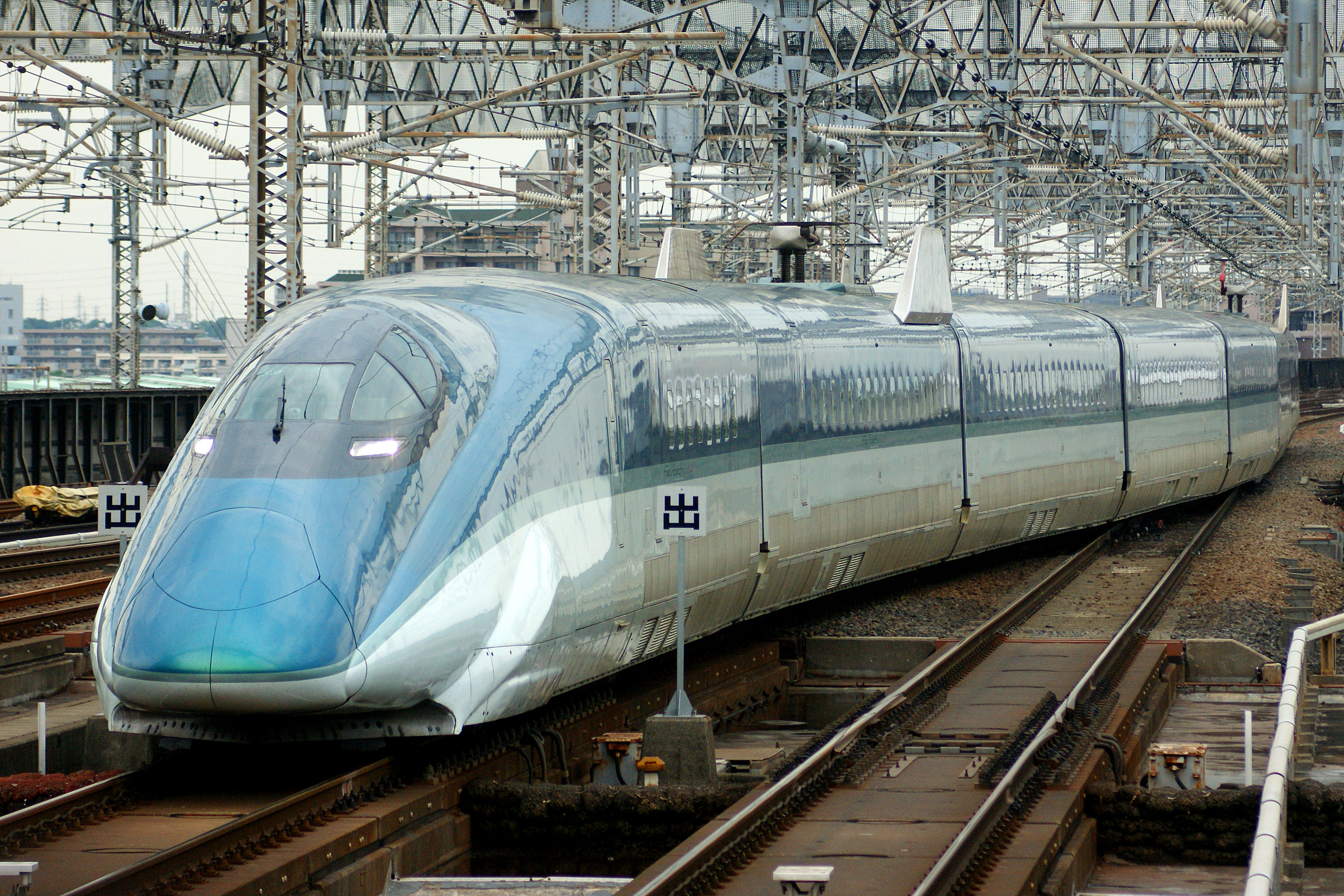
- The Fastech 360S train (stream-line end) at Omiya Station in May 2008
- In service: 2005–2009
- Manufacturers: Hitachi, Kawasaki Heavy Industries
- Constructed: 2005
- Scrapped: 2009
- Number built: 8 vehicles
- Number in service: None
- Number preserved: None
- Number scrapped: 8 vehicles
- Formation: 8 cars
- Fleet numbers: S9
- Operator: JR East
- Depot: Sendai
- Lines served: Tohoku Shinkansen, Joetsu Shinkansen

Specifications
- Car body construction: Aluminium alloy
- Maximum speed: 360 km/h (225 mph) (nominal)
- Electric system: 25 kV AC, 60 Hz Overhead catenary
- Current collection: Pantograph
- Track gauge: 1,435 mm (4 ft 8 1/2 in) standard gauge

This 8-car set (S9) was delivered on 26 June 2005. Cars 1 to 3 were built by Hitachi, and cars 4 to 8 were built by Kawasaki Heavy Industries.

Car E954-1 has a stream-line profile, reminiscent of the 500 series, and E954-8 has an arrow-line profile more reminiscent of the JR East E2 series and E4 series designs.

The train was withdrawn in September 2009 and scrapped.

=== Formation ===
1. E954-1 (T1c)
2. E954-2 (M1) (with pantograph)
3. E954-3 (M2) (with toilet)
4. E954-4 (M2)
5. E954-5 (M1s)
6. E954-6 (M2)
7. E954-7 (M1) (with pantograph)
8. E954-8 (T2c)
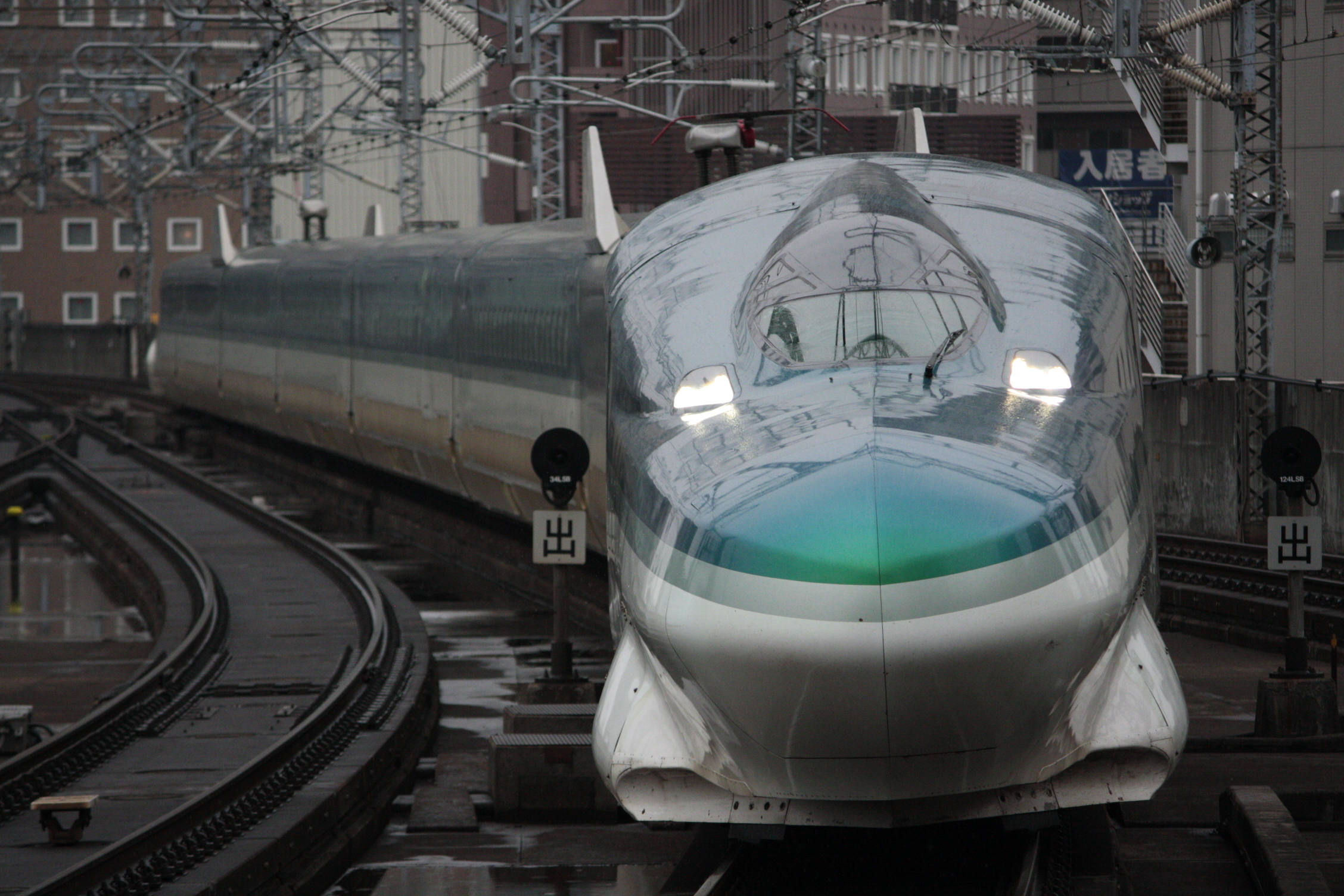
The car 8 end in February 2009 with the arrow-line profile leading

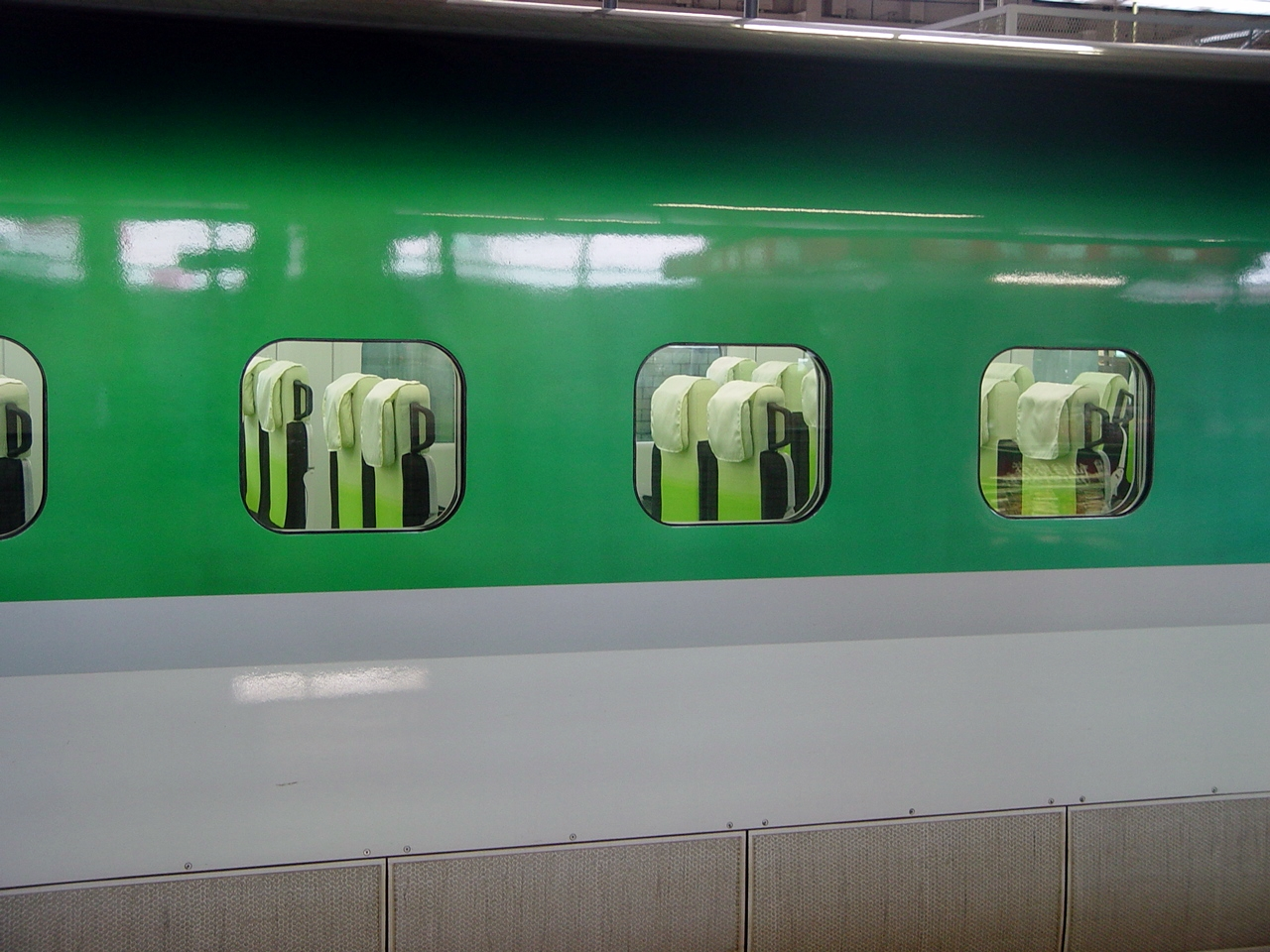
E954-3 (car 3) in April 2006, with the green-coloured seats visible

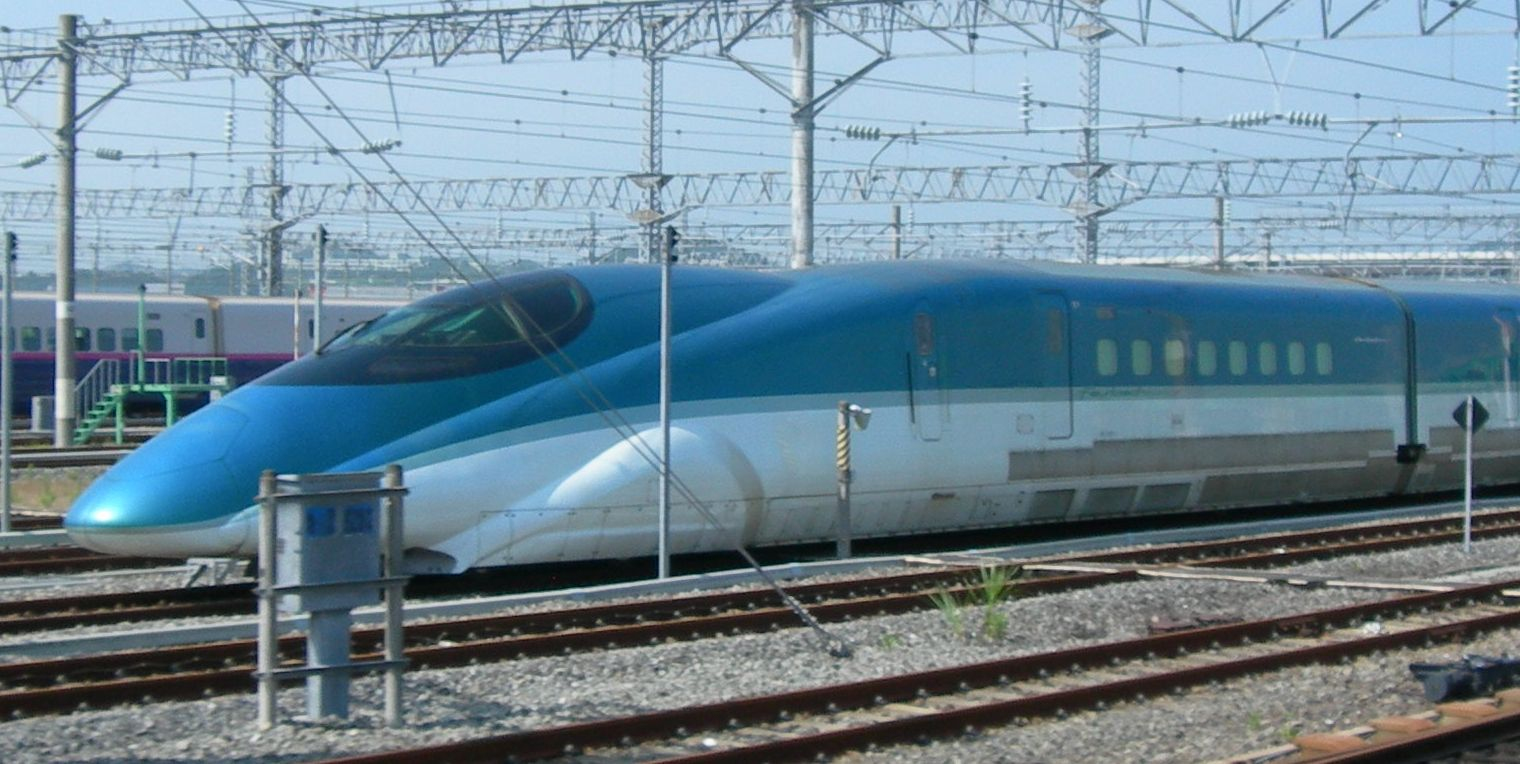

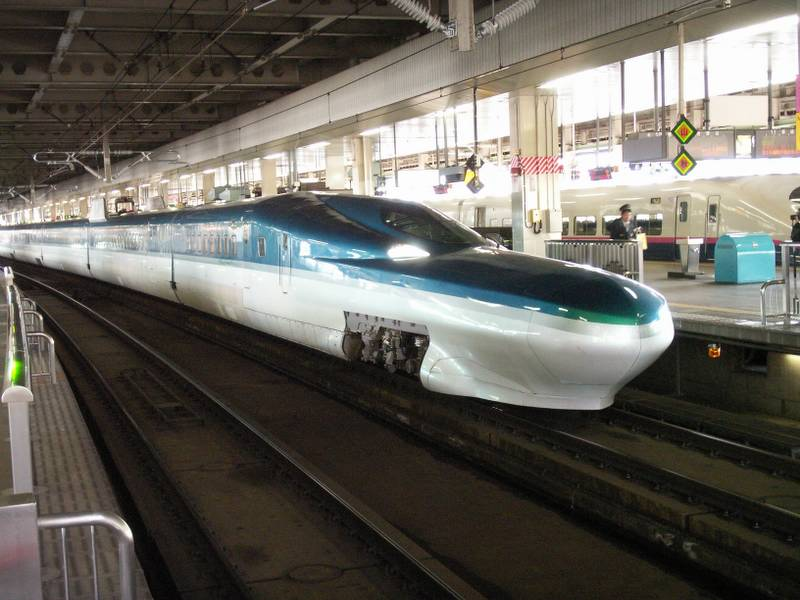

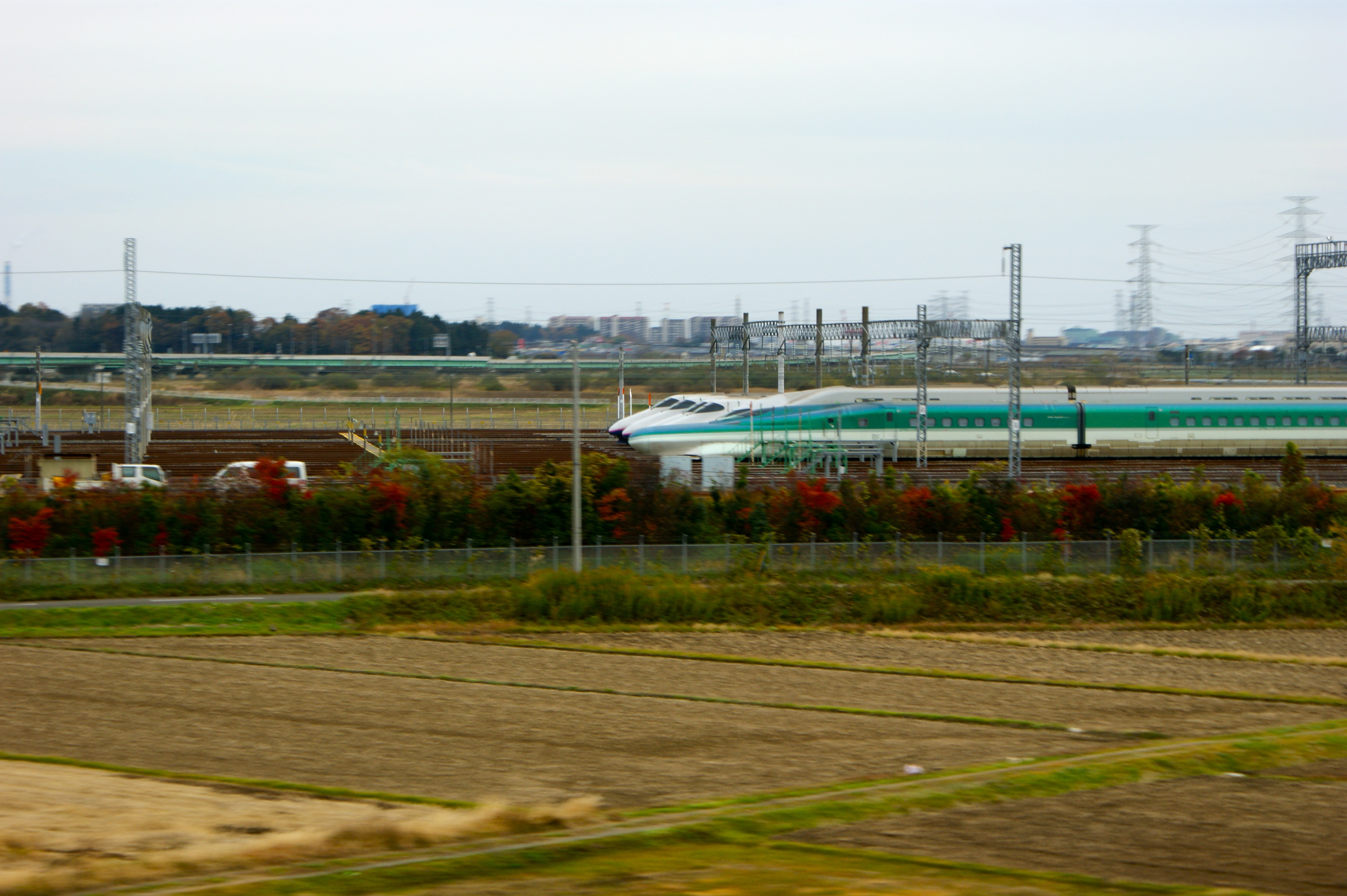

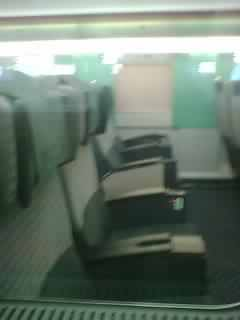

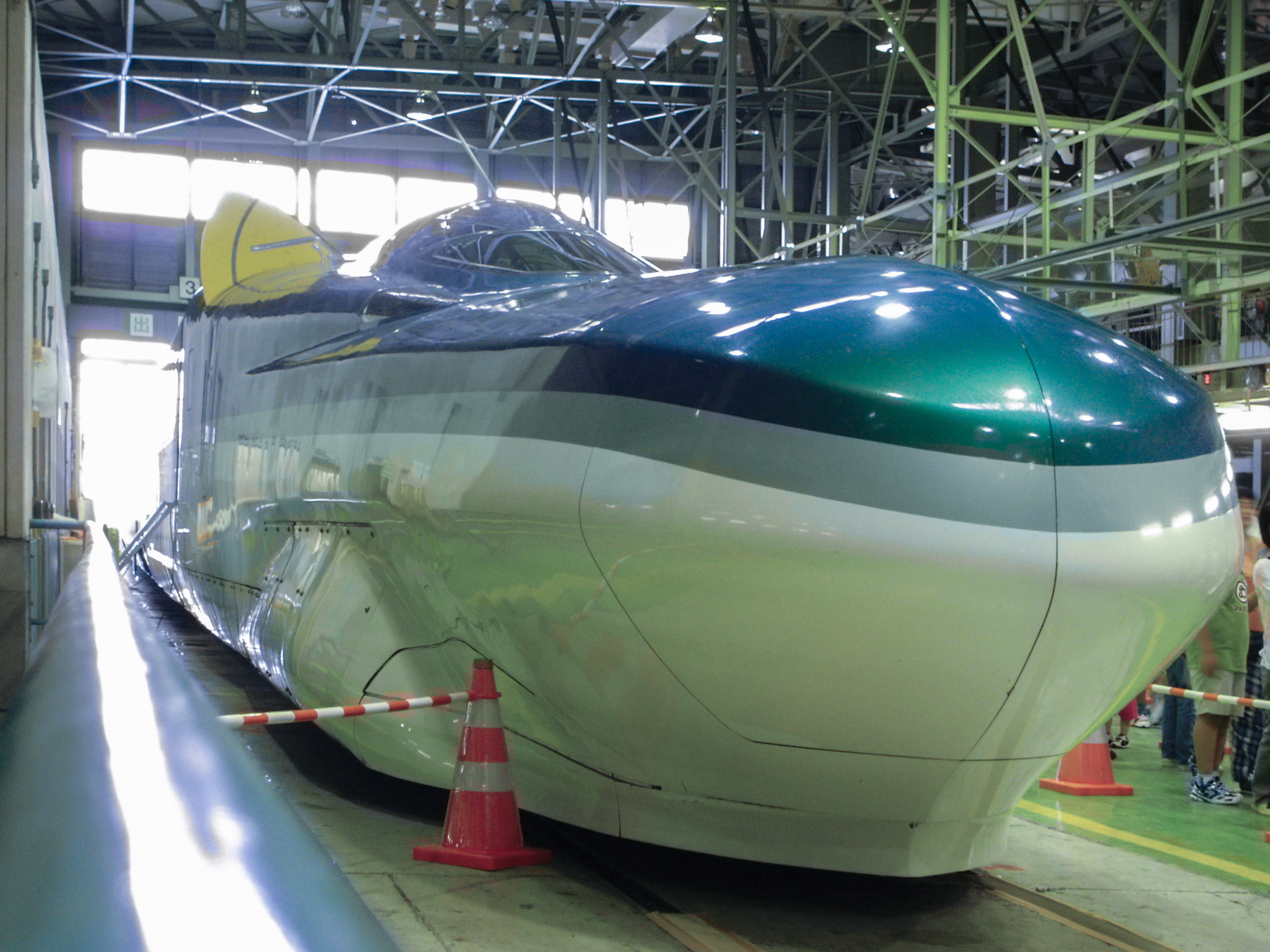

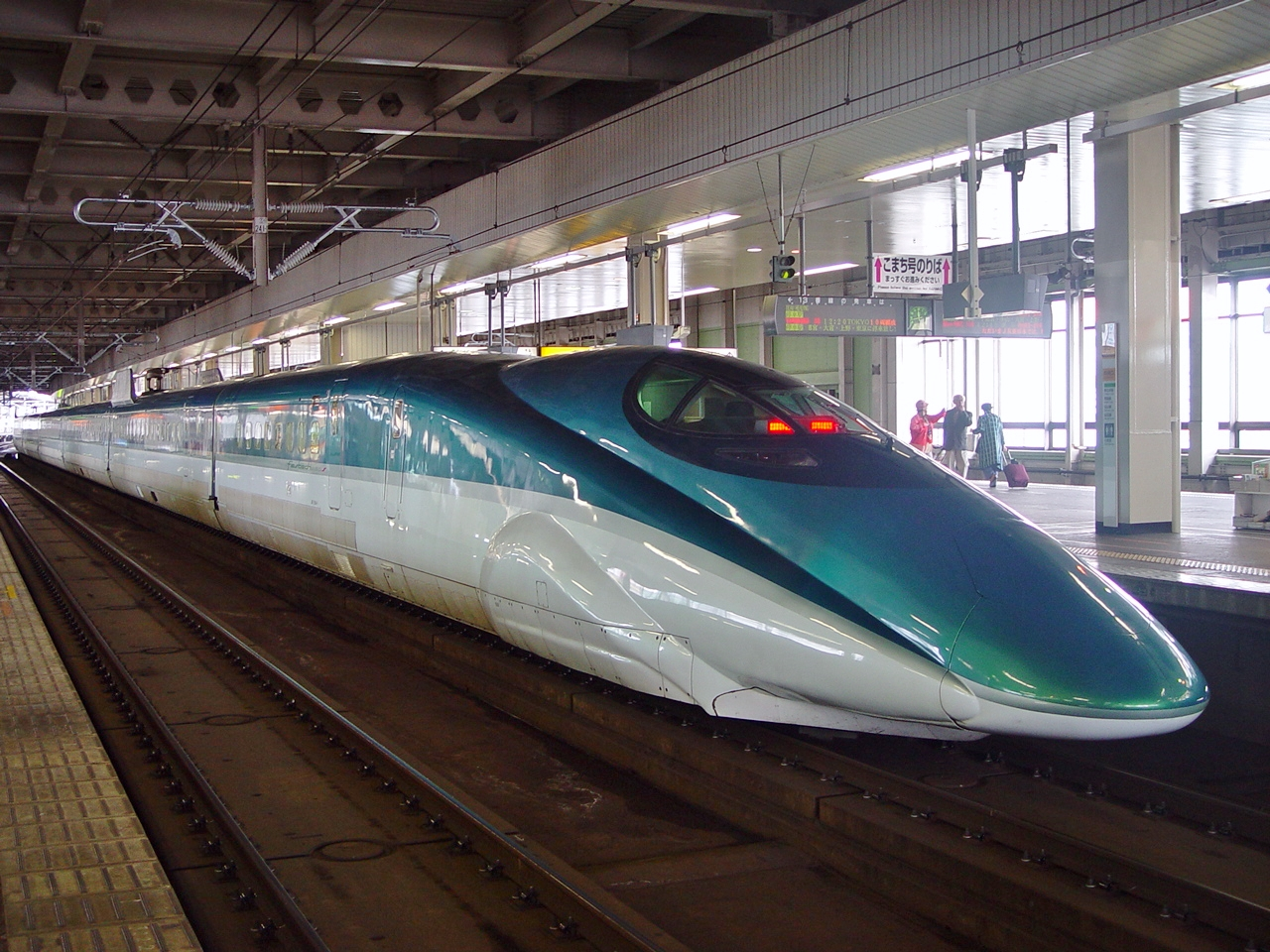

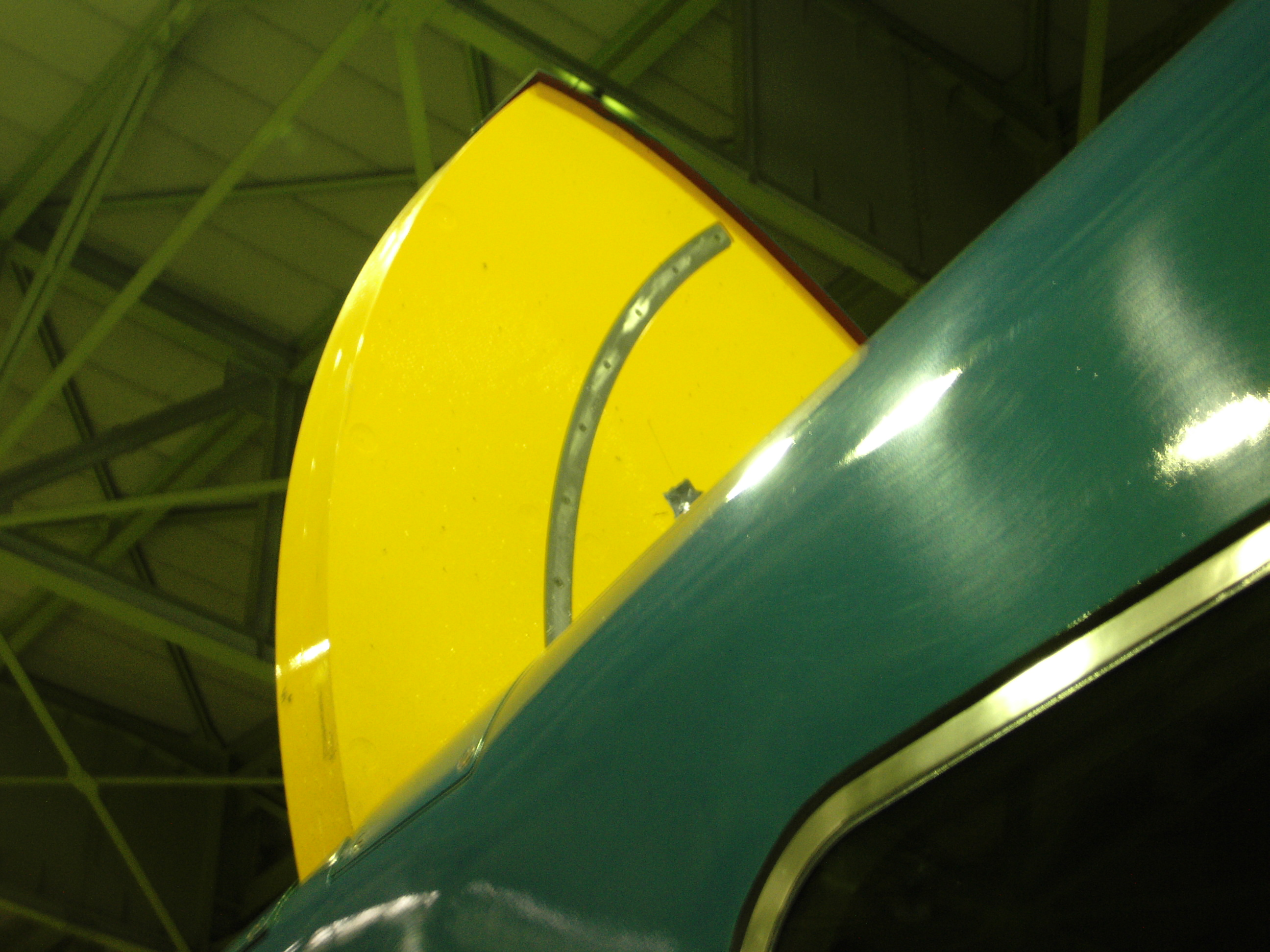

== Class E955 Fastech 360Z ==
Class E955 "Fastech 360Z"
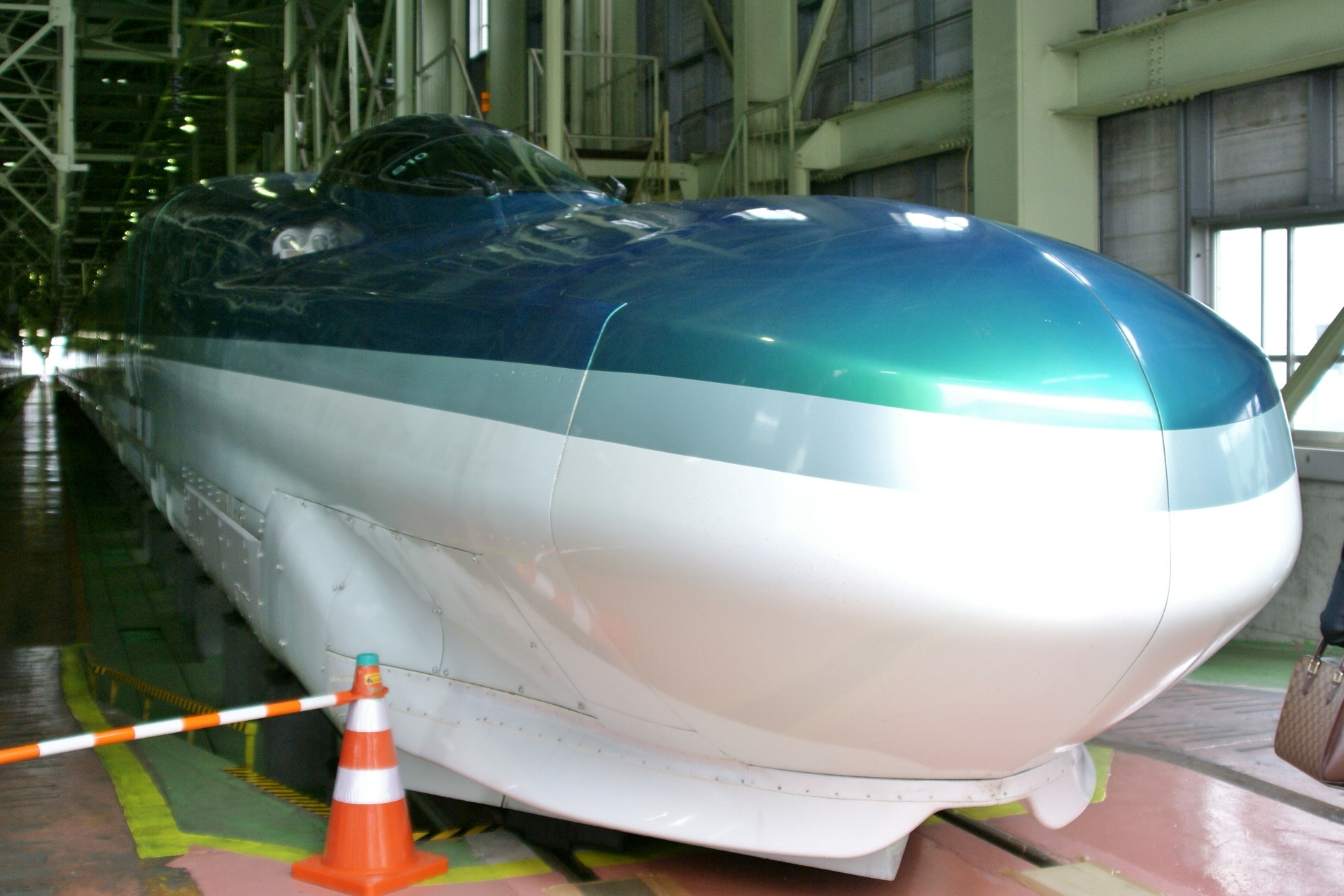
- The Fastech 360Z set S10 at Sendai Shinkansen Depot in July 2008
- In service: 2006–2008
- Manufacturers: Hitachi, Kawasaki Heavy Industries
- Constructed: 2006
- Scrapped: 2008
- Number built: 6 vehicles
- Number in service: None
- Number preserved: None
- Number scrapped: 6 vehicles
- Formation: 6 cars
- Fleet numbers: S10
- Operator: JR East
- Lines served: Tohoku Shinkansen, Akita Shinkansen

Specifications
- Car body construction: Aluminium alloy
- Maximum speed: 360 km/h (225 mph) (nominal); 130 km/h (80 mph) (Akita Shinkansen)
- Electric system: 25/20 kV AC, 50 Hz Overhead catenary
- Current collection: Pantograph
- Track gauge: 1,435 mm (4 ft 8 1/2 in) standard gauge

This 6-car set (S10) was delivered on 6 April 2006. Cars 1 and 4 to 6 were built by Kawasaki Heavy Industries, and cars 2 and 3 were built by Hitachi. The train was withdrawn in December 2008 and scrapped.

=== Formation ===
1. E955-1 (M2c)
2. E955-2 (M1s)
3. E955-3 (M1) (with pantograph and toilet)
4. E955-4 (M1)
5. E955-5 (M1) (with pantograph)
6. E955-6 (M2c)
