= Ramsgate Maintenance Depot =

Traction maintenance depot located in Ramsgate, Kent, UK

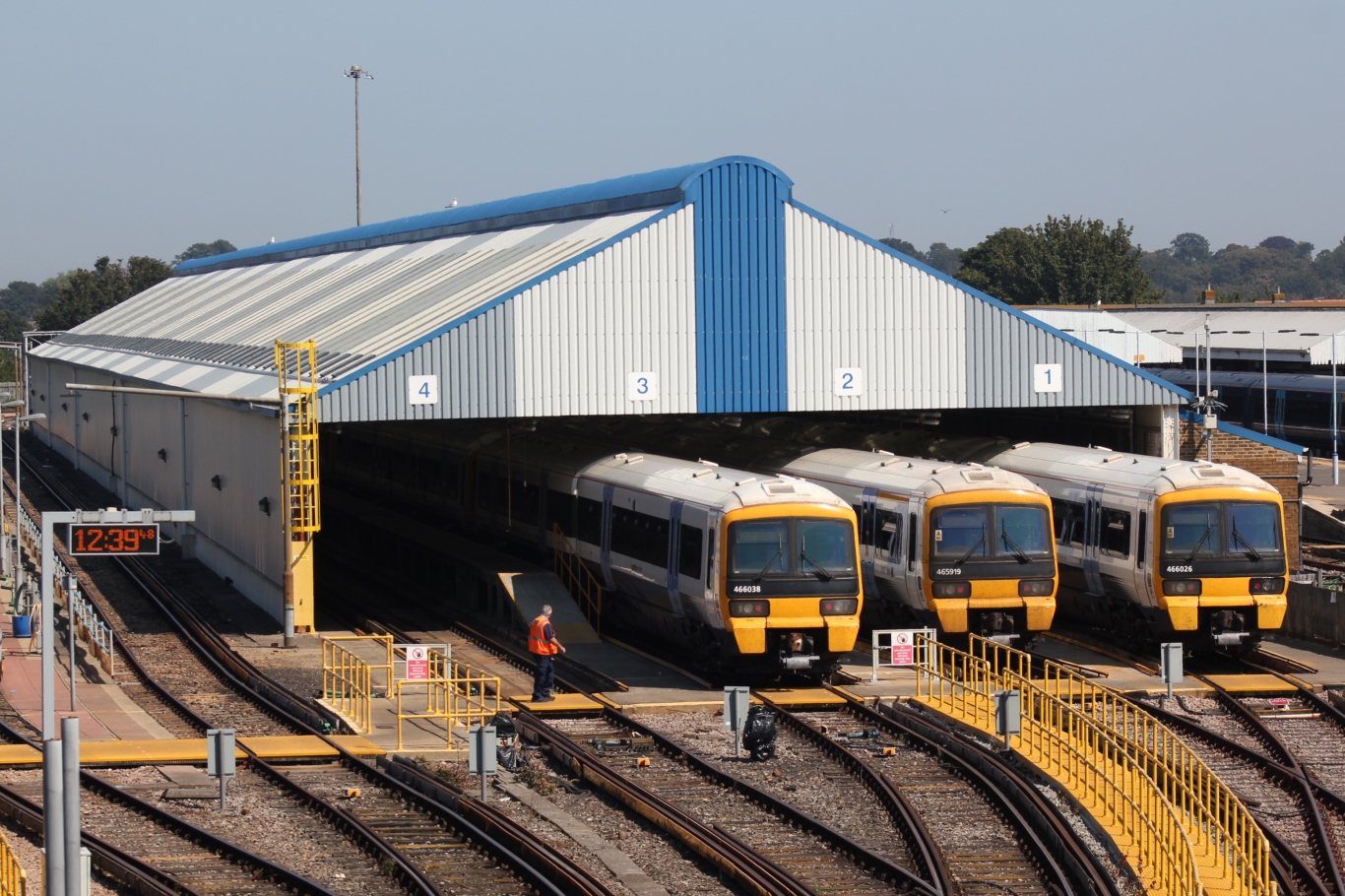
- Interactive map of Ramsgate Maintenance Depot

Location
- Location: Ramsgate, Kent, England
- Coordinates: 51.3423°N 1.404°E
- OS grid: TR371658

Characteristics
- Owner: Network Rail
- Operator: Southeastern
- Depot code: RE (1973 -)
- Type: EMU

History
- Opened: 1930
- Former depot code: 74B (1948 - October 1958) 73G (October 1958 - May 1973)

Ramsgate Maintenance Depot is a traction maintenance depot located in Ramsgate, Kent, England. The depot is situated on the Chatham Main Line and is immediately northwest of Ramsgate station, with access to the maintenance facilities and stabling sidings almost exclusively accessible from the Margate direction. Trains coming from Minster junction can only access the depot reception roads, the carriage cleaning shed (roads 1-4) and stabling roads 5-6 without reversing.

The depot code is RE.

== Accidents and incidents ==
- On 28 January 1993, 4CEP unit 1521 overran the buffers at the depot, with one driving carriage left perched precariously above houses. Three similar incidents had happened in the previous ten years.
- On 28 November 2024, 395008 was derailed in the sidings between Ramsgate and Minster.

== Allocation ==
The depot is operated by Southeastern and maintains Class 375, 377, 395, 465 and 466s.

The depot is the home depot for the Class 375 and 377/5 units, although these are also maintained at Gillingham and Slade Green depots.
