= 400 Series Shinkansen =

Japanese high speed train type

400 series
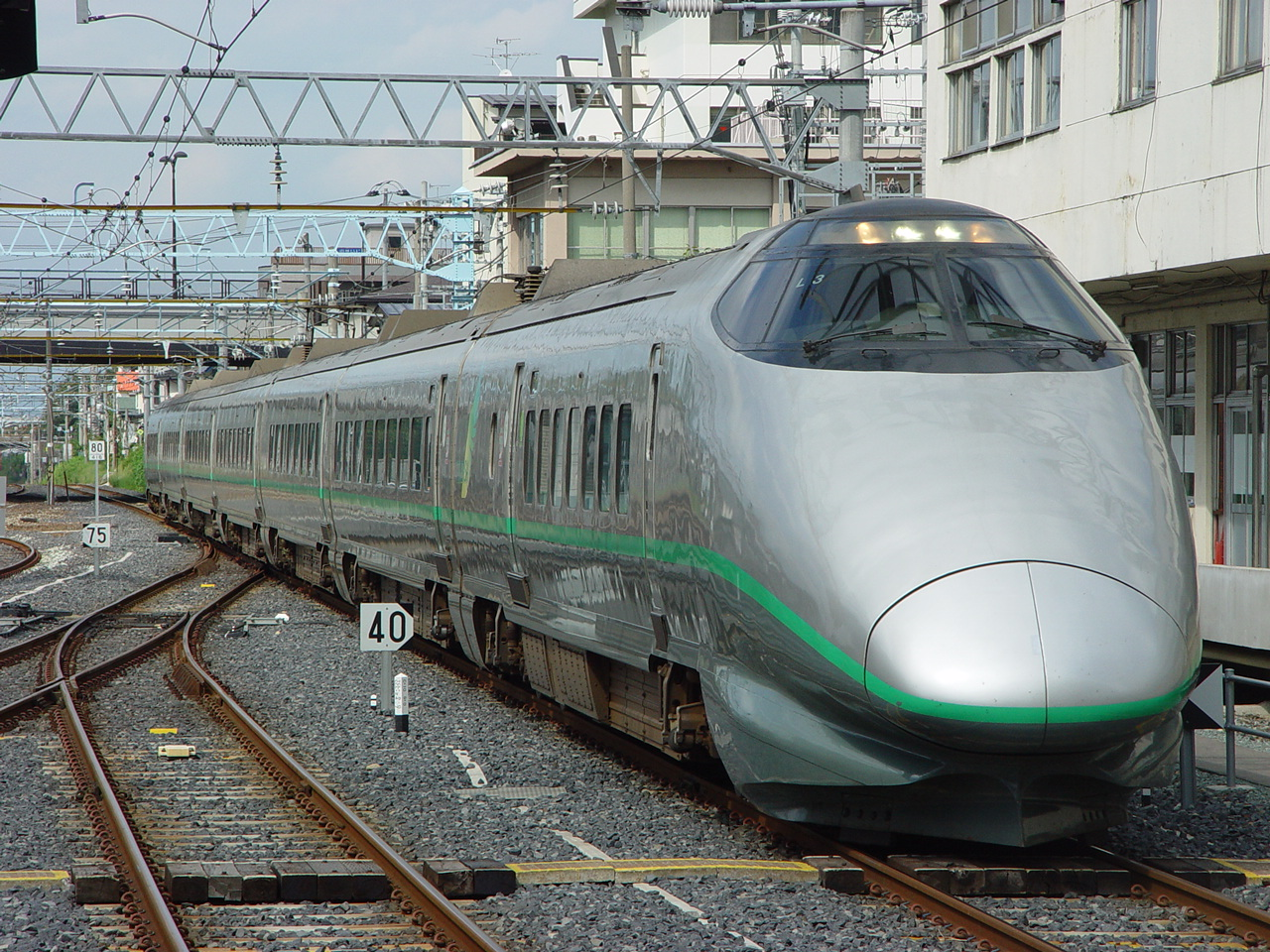
- A 400 series train, painted in later livery in 2002
- In service: 1 July 1992 – 18 April 2010 (17 years, 291 days)
- Manufacturer: Kawasaki Heavy Industries (Note: Hitachi and the Tokyu Car Corporation also contributed to the prototype set.)
- Family name: Mini-Shinkansen
- Constructed: 1992–1995
- Refurbished: 1999–2001
- Scrapped: 2009–2010
- Number built: 84 vehicles (12 sets)
- Number in service: None
- Number preserved: 1 vehicle
- Number scrapped: 83 vehicles
- Successor: E3-2000 series
- Formation: 7 cars per trainset
- Fleet numbers: L1–L12
- Capacity: 399 (20 Green + 379 Standard)
- Operator: JR East
- Depot: Yamagata
- Lines served: Yamagata Shinkansen (1992–2010); Tōhoku Shinkansen (1992–2010)

Specifications
- Car body construction: Steel
- Car length: End cars: 22.825 m (74 ft 10.6 in); Intermediate cars: 20.5 m (67 ft 3 in)
- Width: 2.947 m (9 ft 8 in)
- Doors: 1 per side
- Maximum speed: 240 km/h (150 mph)
- Traction system: 24 × 210 kW (280 hp) thyristor drive
- Power output: 5,040 kW (6,760 hp)
- Acceleration: 1.6 km/(h⋅s) (0.99 mph/s)
- Deceleration: 2.6 km/(h⋅s) (1.6 mph/s)
- Electric systems: Overhead line: 25 kV 50 Hz AC; 20 kV 50 Hz AC
- Current collection: PS204 pantograph
- Bogies: Motored: DT204; Trailer: TR7006
- Safety systems: ATC-2, DS-ATC, ATS-P
- Multiple working: Up to two units: 200 or E4 series
- Track gauge: 1,435 mm (4 ft 8 1/2 in) standard gauge

The 400 series (Japanese: 400系) was a Japanese Shinkansen high-speed train type operated by the East Japan Railway Company (JR East) between 1992 and 2010 on Tsubasa services on Japan's first mini-Shinkansen line, the Yamagata Shinkansen branch from the main Tōhoku Shinkansen.

The fleet of 400 series trains was leased by JR East from the owning company, Yamagata JR Chokutsū Tokkyū Hoyū Kikō (山形ジェイアール直通特急保有機構(株)), a third-sector company jointly owned by JR East and Yamagata Prefecture.

The trains were originally formed as six-car sets, but a seventh car was added to each set in 1995 due to the popularity of the Tsubasa services.

== Pre-series set ==
The pre-series set, S4, was delivered in October 1990 and unveiled to the press on 26 October 1990. It was a six-car set, arranged as shown below, with all cars motored.

| Car No. | 1 | 2 | 3 | 4 | 5 | 6 |
|---|---|---|---|---|---|---|
| Numbering | 401-1 | 402-1 | 403-1 | 404-1 | 405-1 | 406-1 |
| Seating capacity | 20 | 67 | 60 | 68 | 64 | 56 |

The unit featured three different types of bolsterless bogies: DT9028 on cars 1 and 3, DT9029 on cars 2 and 4, and DT9030 on cars 5 and 6. The Green car seats were fitted with seat-back television screens, a feature not adopted on subsequent production sets.

Cars 1 and 2 were built by Tokyu Car Corporation, cars 3 to 4 were built by Hitachi, and cars 5 to 6 were built by Kawasaki Heavy Industries. Cars 12 and 14 were equipped with pantographs.

Test running began on the Ōu Main Line between Niwasaka and Itaya on 14 November 1990. From 23 January 1991, testing was conducted in conjunction with a newly converted eight-car 200 series K set on the Tōhoku Shinkansen between Sendai and Kitakami. On 26 March 1991, set S4 established a new Japanese speed record of 336 km/h (209 mph) on the Jōetsu Shinkansen in the Yuzawa Tunnel between Echigo-Yuzawa and Urasa. On 19 September 1991, the train set a further record of 345 km/h (214 mph) on the same section of track.

Test running continued into 1992, with set S4 reaching Tokyo for the first time on 20 May 1992. The pre-series set was subsequently modified to production-standard specifications, becoming set L1 on 29 June 1992.

== History ==
=== Introduction ===
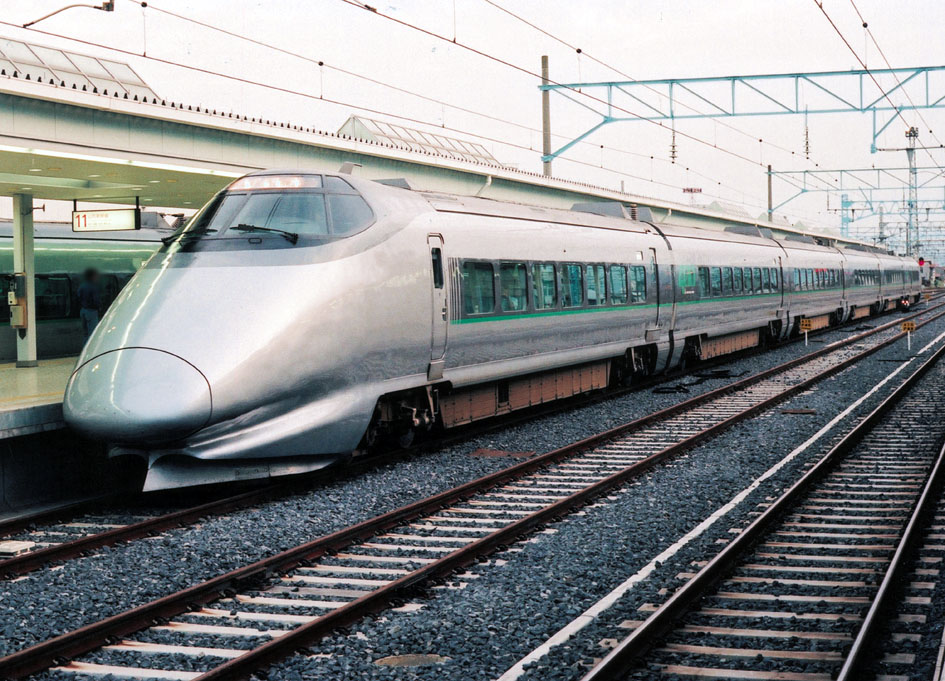
A six-car 400 series set in original livery

The fleet of twelve six-car sets entered service on Tsubasa Shinkansen services from 1 July 1992. Owing to sustained demand, all sets were later lengthened to seven cars. This took place between November and December 1995, with the insertion of a new type 429 trailer car as car 15.

=== Withdrawal ===
Withdrawals began in December 2008, starting with set L1. The entire fleet was scheduled to be withdrawn by summer 2009 and replaced by E3-2000 series trains. However, one set, L3, remained in service until 18 April 2010, with the date chosen to mark 18 years of service. This final 400 series Shinkansen was coupled to an E4 series train during its last run.

=== Preservation ===
The first eleven sets to be withdrawn were all cut up at Sendai General Depot, but one car (Green car 411-3) of the last set to be withdrawn, L3, was stored at the former Fukushima depot before being moved to Omiya in Saitama Prefecture in December 2017 where it is preserved at the Railway Museum.

== Formation ==
The production 400 series sets were configured as shown below following the addition of a trailer car (car 15) in late 1995.

| Car No. | 11 | 12 | 13 | 14 | 15 | 16 | 17 |
|---|---|---|---|---|---|---|---|
| Designation | Msc | M' | M | M' | T | M | M'c |
| Class | Green | Ordinary reserved | | | | Ordinary non‑reserved | |
| Numbering | 411 | 426-200 | 425 | 426 | 429 | 425 | 422 |
| Capacity | 20 | 67 | 60 | 68 | 64 | 64 | 56 |
| Facilities | Toilet, wheelchair space | Payphone | Toilet, payphone | Luggage space | Toilet, luggage space | Toilet, payphone | Luggage space |

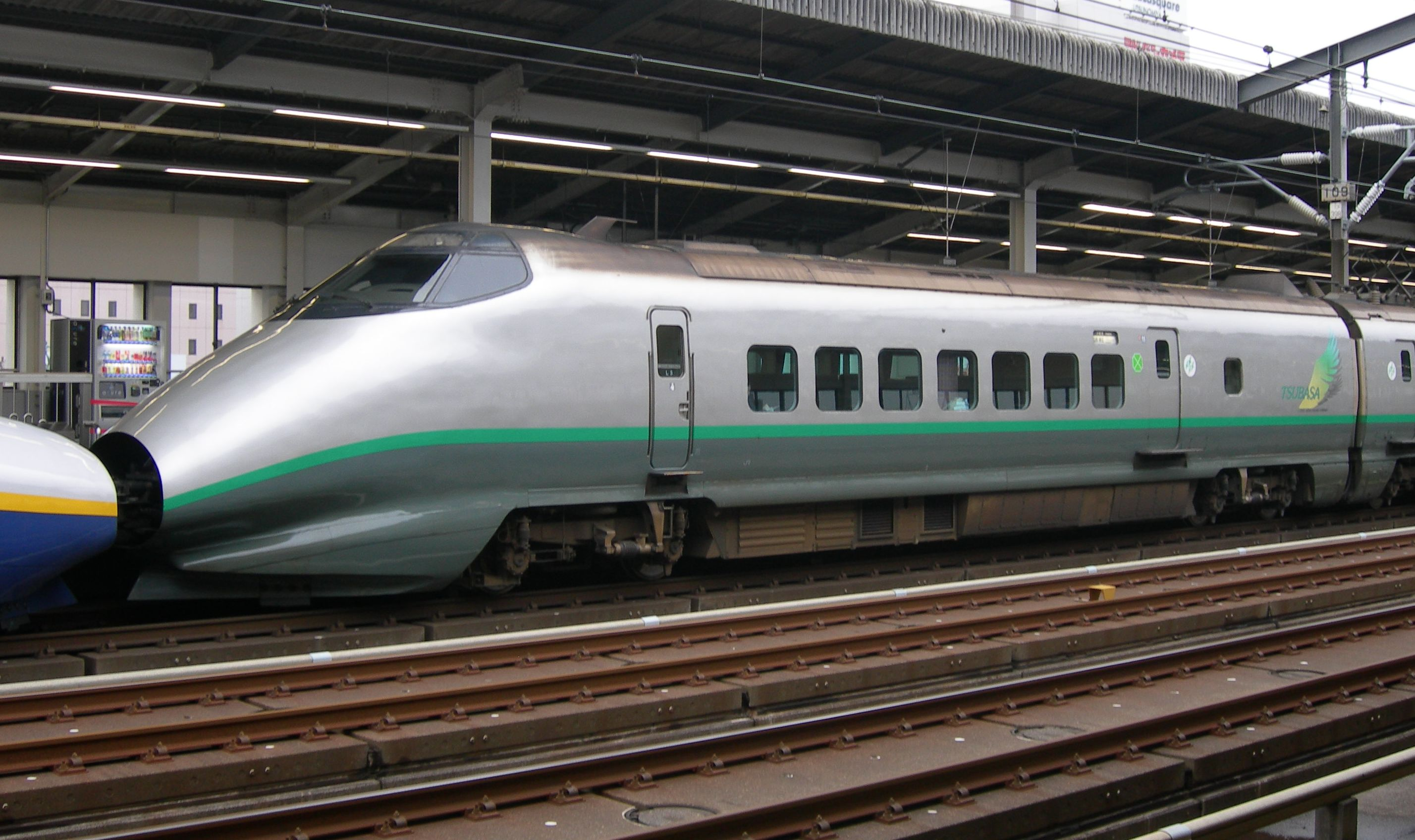
411-3 (car 11)

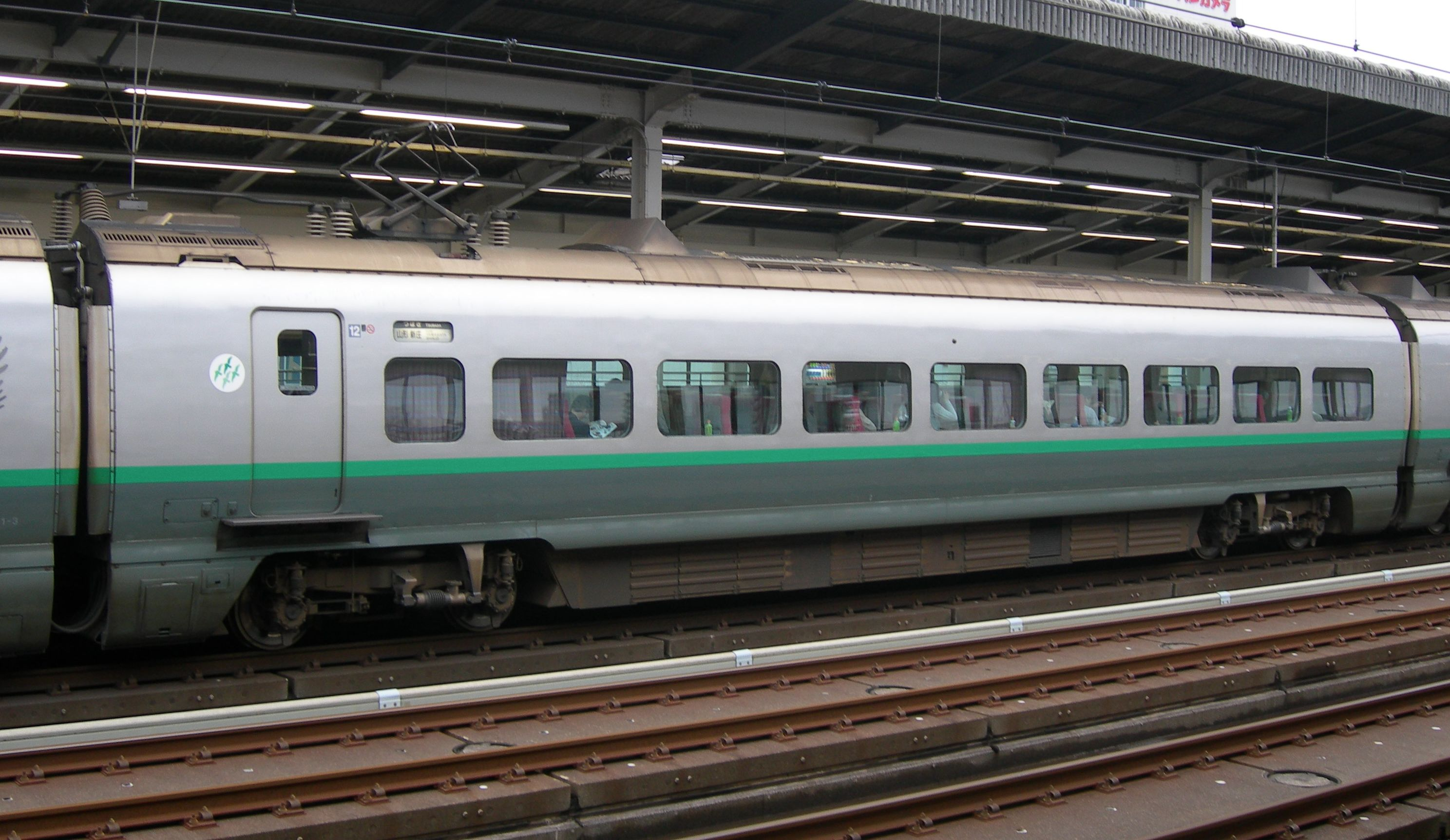
426-203 (car 12)

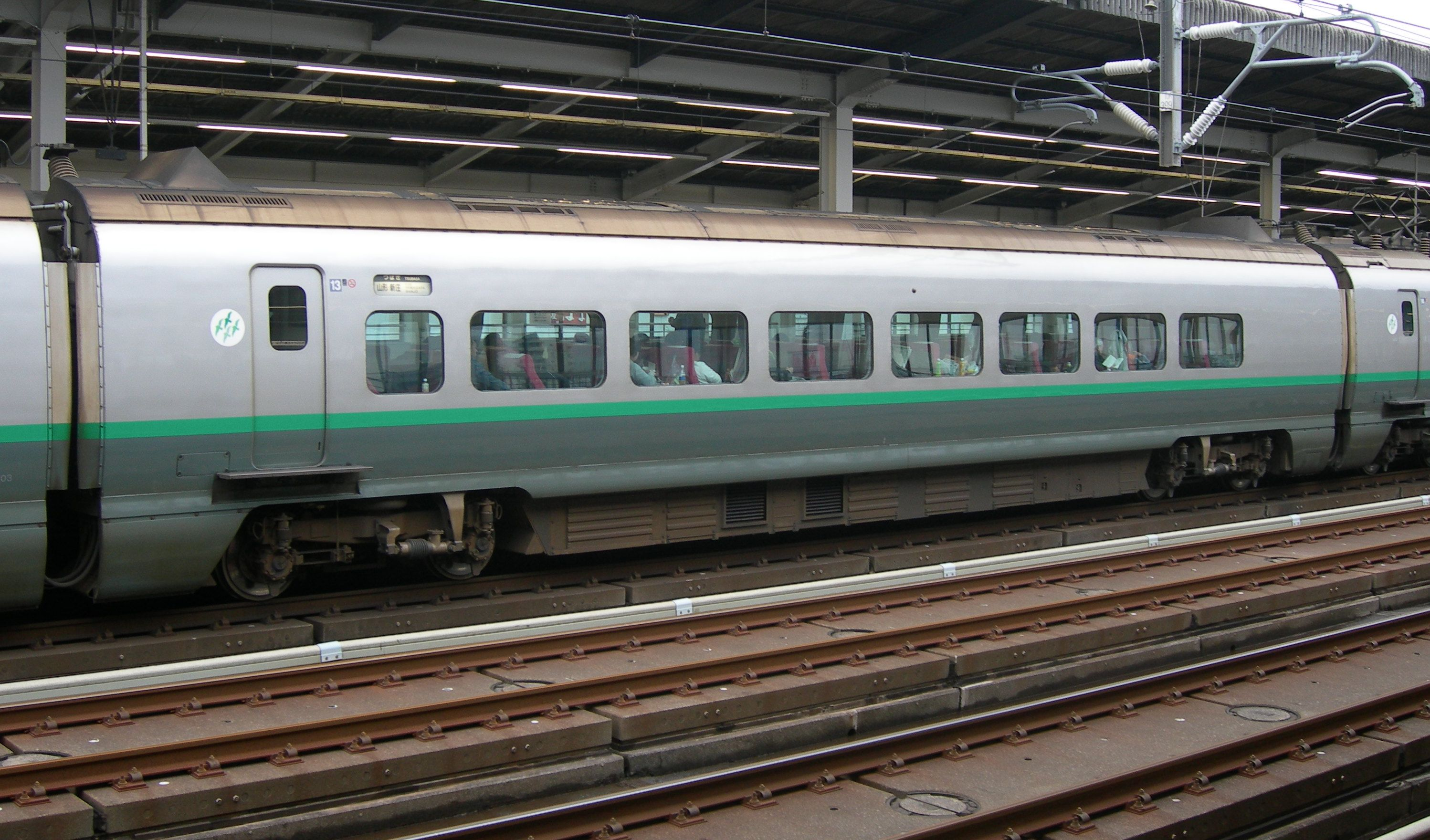
425-3 (car 13)

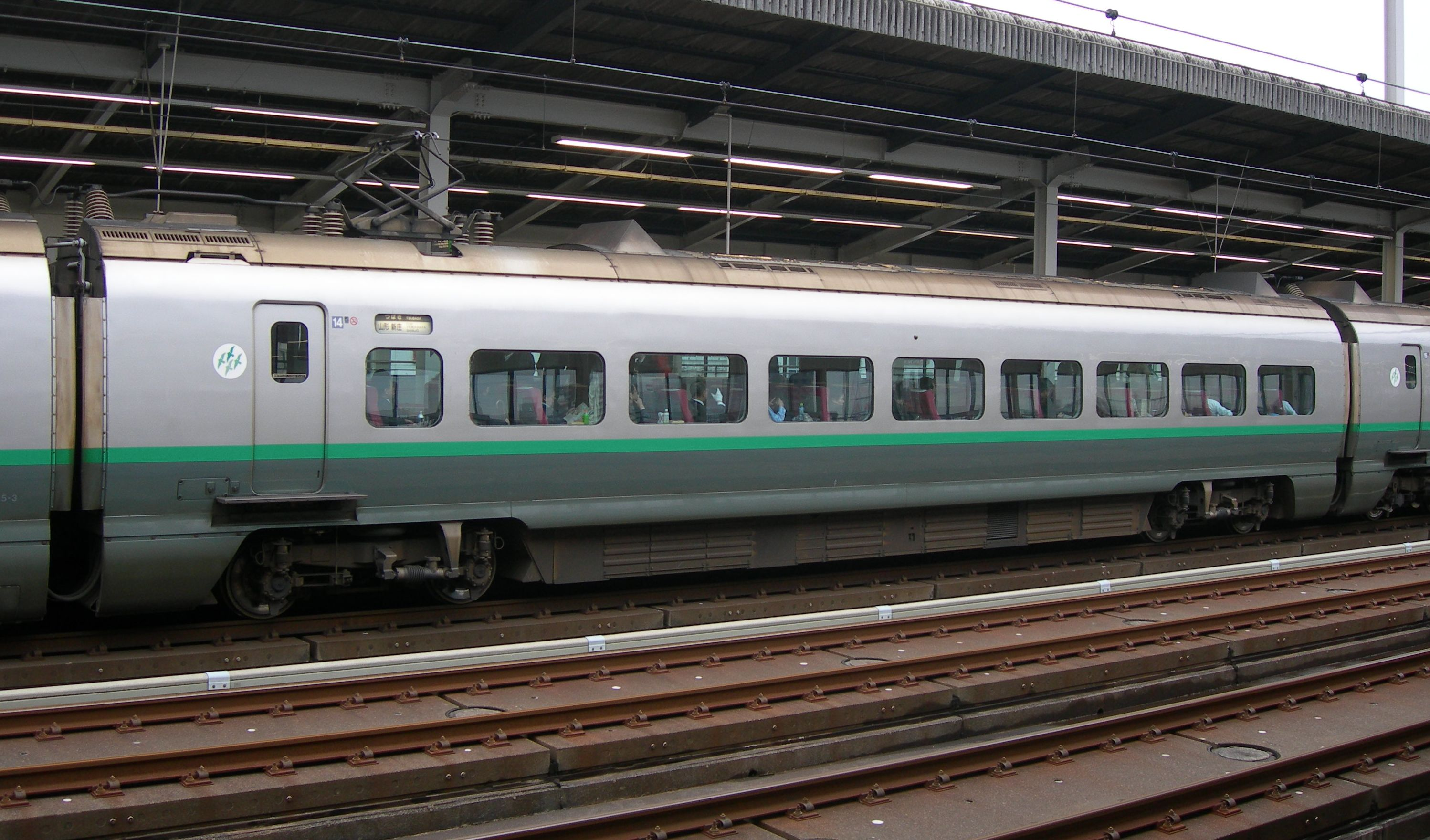
426-3 (car 14)

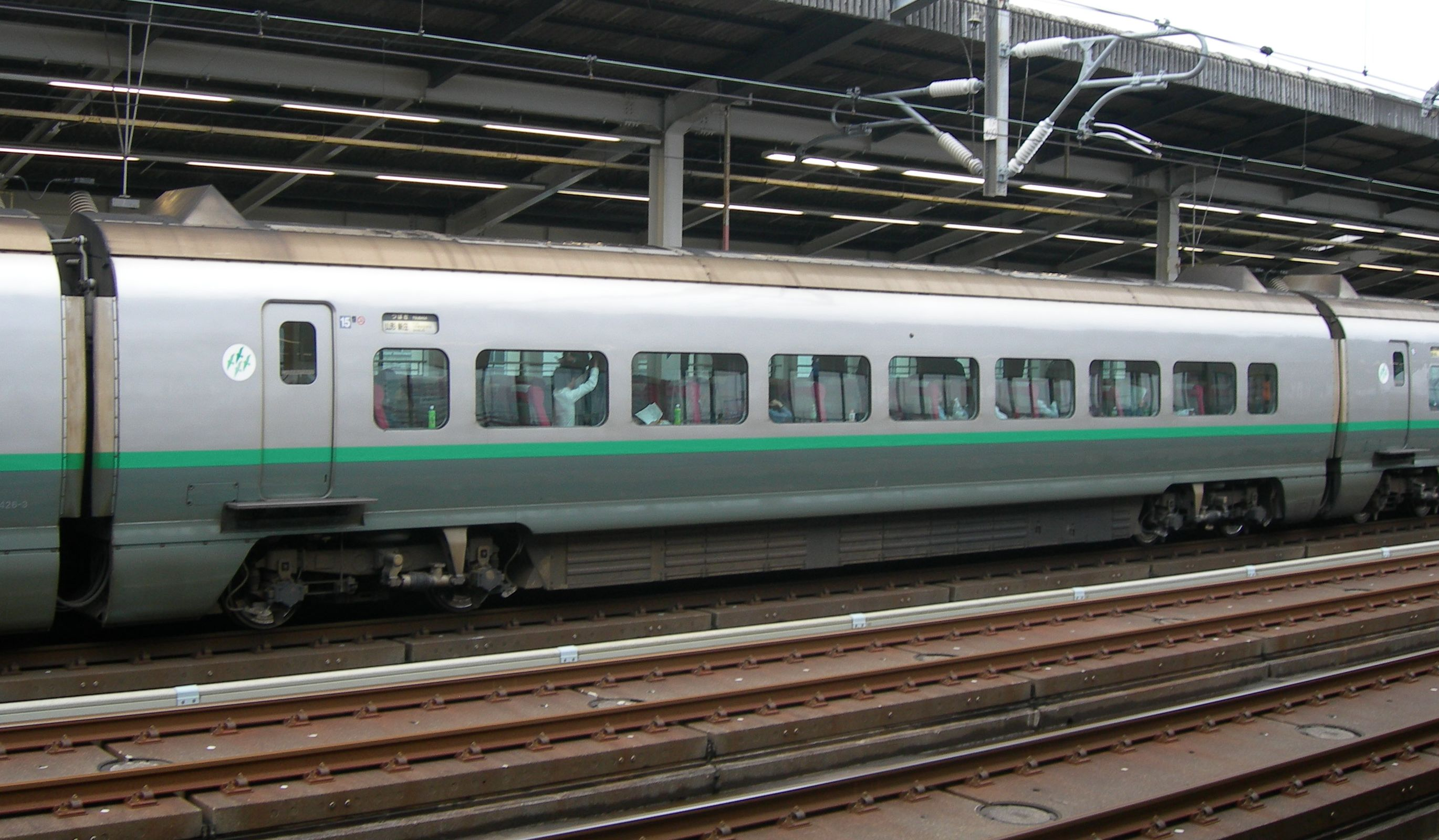
429-3 (car 15)

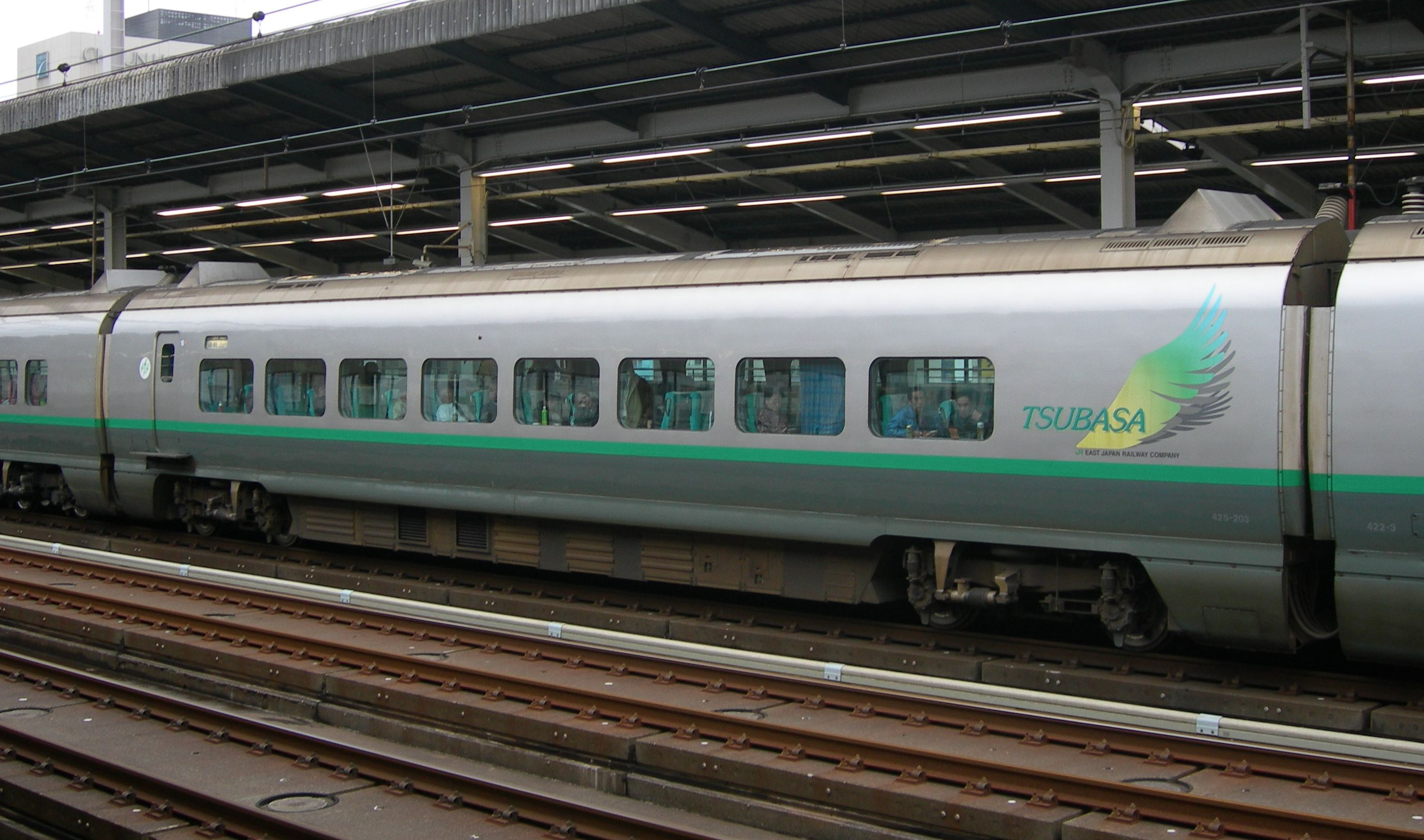
425-203 (car 16)

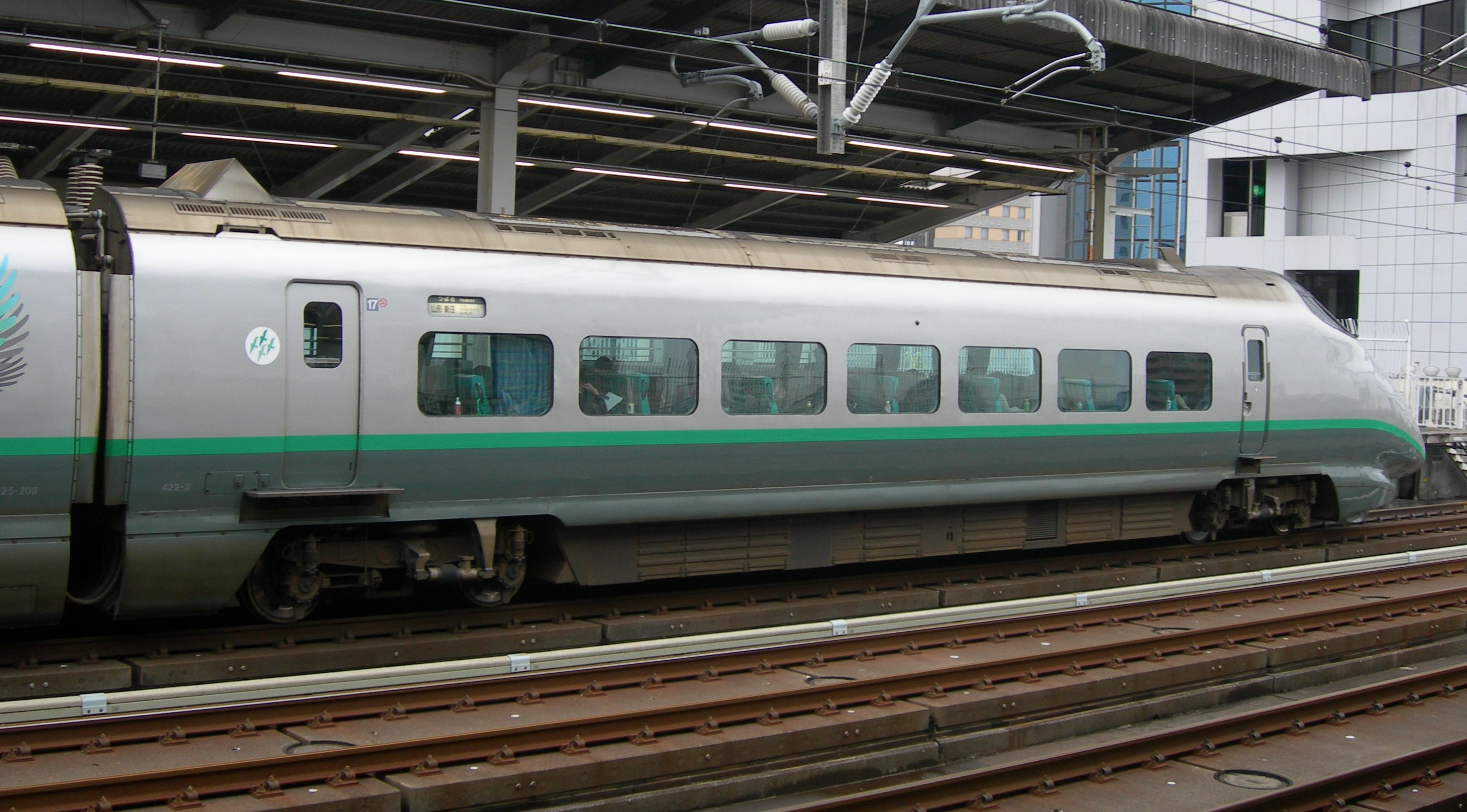
422-3 (car 17)

== Fleet details ==
| Set No. | Manufacturer | Delivered | 7th car added | Refurbished | DS-ATC added | Withdrawn | Remarks |
|---|---|---|---|---|---|---|---|
| L1 | Tokyu Car, Hitachi, Kawasaki | 1 November 1990 | 14 November 1995 | 3 March 2000 | 27 July 2005 | 1 January 2009 | Originally pre-series set S4, converted 29 June 1992. |
| L2 | Kawasaki | 17 January 1992 | 20 November 1995 | 14 September 2001 | 7 October 2005 | 23 January 2009 | |
| L3 | Kawasaki | 28 January 1992 | 2 December 1995 | 11 June 2001 | 12 September 2005 | 18 April 2010 | Last set to be withdrawn. Car 411-3 preserved at the Railway Museum. |
| L4 | Kawasaki | 6 March 1992 | 12 December 1995 | 16 December 1999 | 28 May 2005 | 18 September 2009 | First set to be refurbished and repainted. |
| L5 | Kawasaki | 23 March 1992 | 10 December 1995 | 28 July 2000 | 26 November 2005 | 21 April 2009 | |
| L6 | Kawasaki | 2 April 1992 | 8 December 1995 | 16 October 2001 | 24 December 2005 | 26 May 2009 | |
| L7 | Kawasaki | 13 April 1992 | 6 December 1995 | 19 September 2000 | 2 November 2005 | 15 May 2009 | |
| L8 | Kawasaki | 1 May 1992 | 4 December 1995 | 19 June 2000 | 24 June 2005 | 3 April 2009 | |
| L9 | Kawasaki | 11 May 1992 | 20 December 1995 | 14 April 2000 | 22 March 2006 | 21 February 2009 | Car 15 built by Hitachi. |
| L10 | Kawasaki | 29 May 1992 | 14 December 1995 | 30 March 2001 | 28 February 2006 | 7 August 2009 | Car 15 built by Hitachi. |
| L11 | Kawasaki | 12 June 1992 | 16 December 1995 | 19 February 2001 | 6 February 2006 | 20 June 2009 | Car 15 built by Hitachi. |
| L12 | Kawasaki | 25 June 1992 | 18 December 1995 | 29 May 2000 | 27 April 2005 | 19 March 2009 | Car 15 built by Hitachi. |

== Design ==
=== Exterior ===
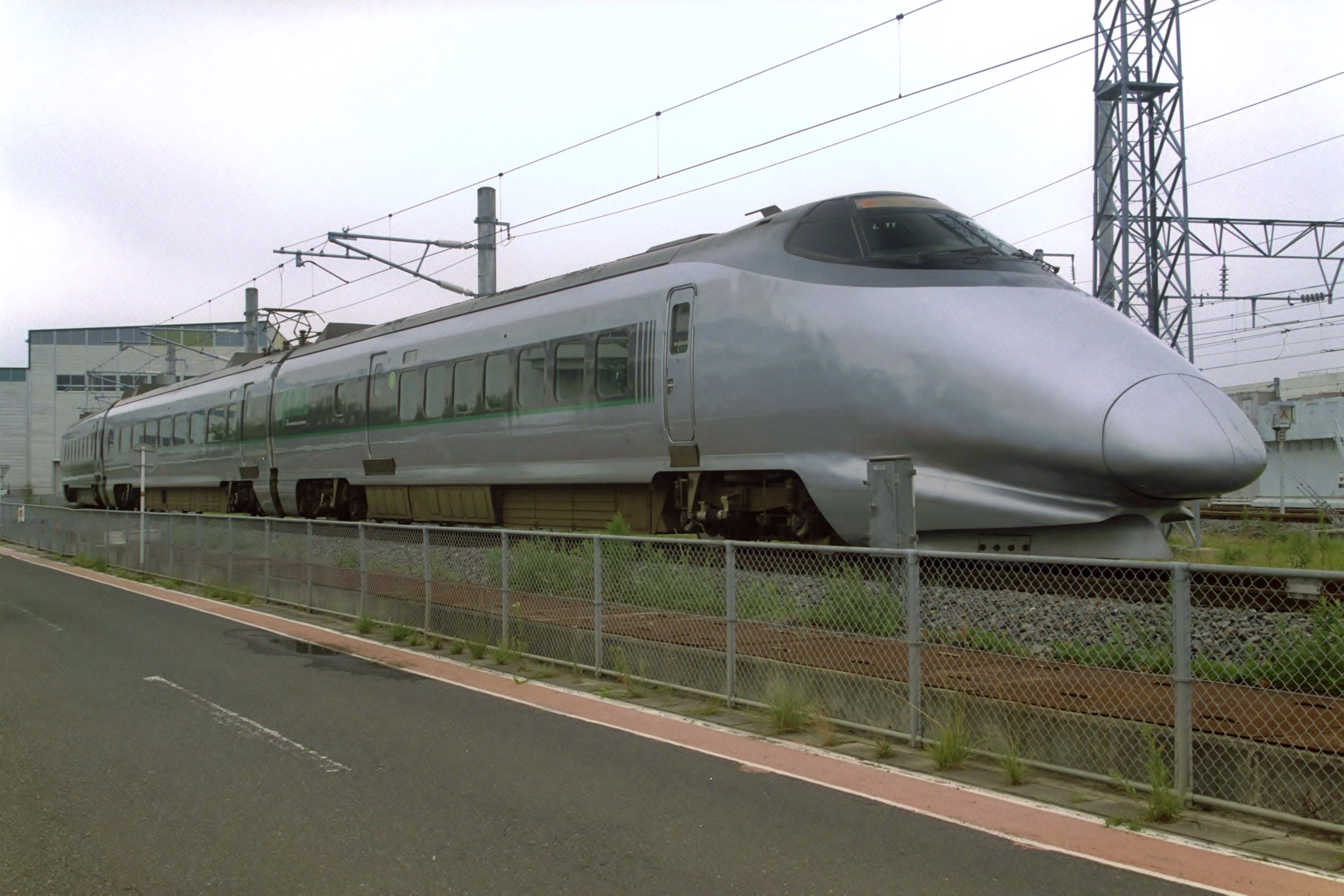
Set L11 in its original livery in July 1997

The 400 series was originally painted medium silver-grey, with a darker roof and darkened areas around the cab windows and under-frame. Between 1999 and 2001, the fleet was refurbished and repainted, adopting a revised livery featuring a higher area of dark bluish-grey on the lower body, rising to just below the side windows and separated from the silver-grey upper body by a green stripe. The dark gray treatment on the roof and around the cab windows was removed.

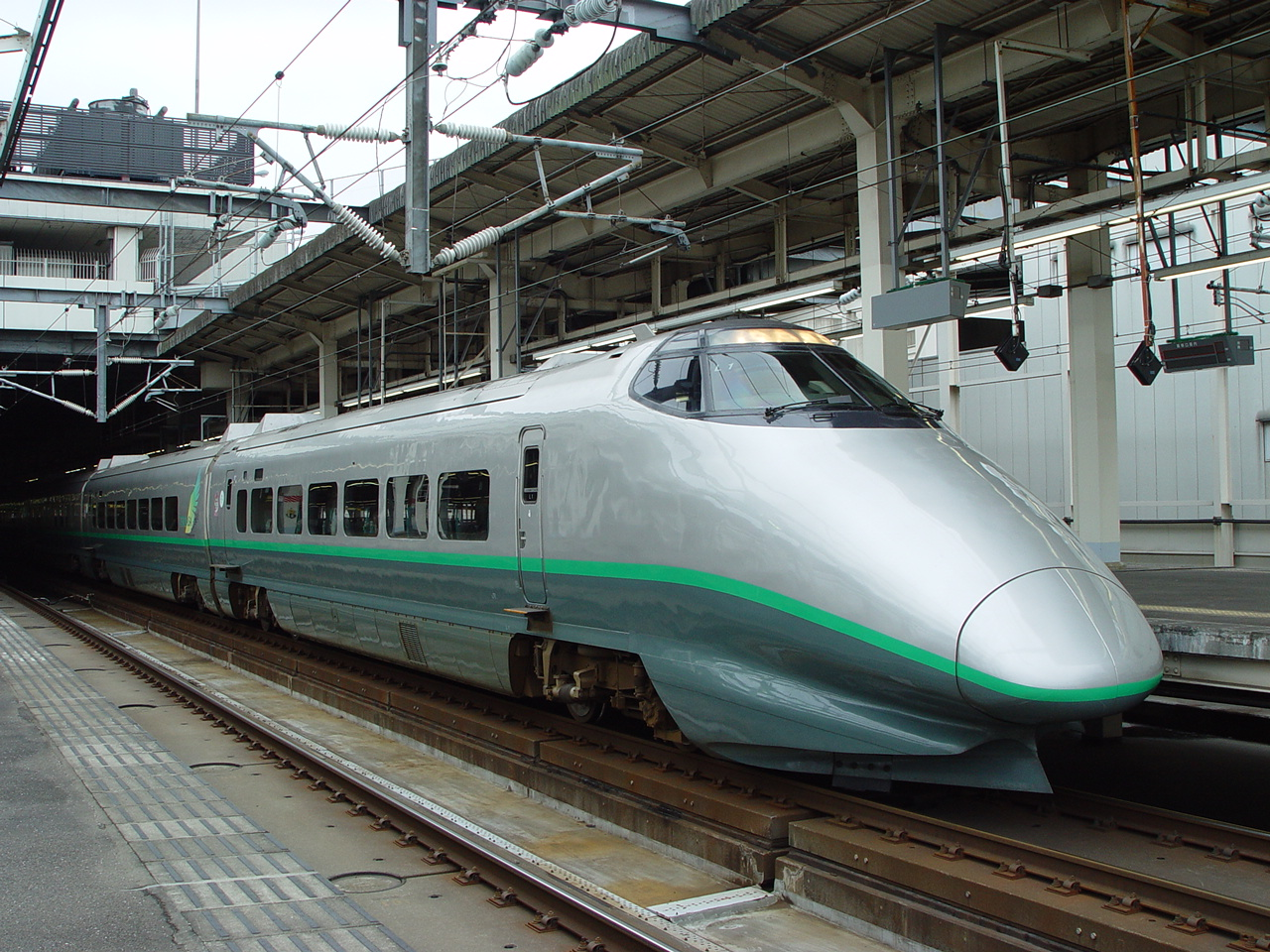
Set L1 at Omiya Station in June 2002, showing the door steps extended

Compared with the purpose-built high-speed Shinkansen lines, the Yamagata Shinkansen route is constrained by its legacy infrastructure. While the track gauge was widened, the original loading gauge was retained, requiring the 400 series to be designed with a narrower cross-section, leading to the "mini-Shinkansen" designation. When stopping at stations on the purpose-built high-speed Shinkansen lines, a retractable step flips up from beneath the doors to bridge the platform gap.

=== Interior ===
As a result of the narrower cross section, ordinary-class cars were fitted with 2+2 abreast seating, compared with the 3+2 configuration used on most Shinkansen trains. Green cars featured 2+1 abreast seating, compared with the 2+2 layout typical of other Shinkansen services. On subsequent mini-Shinkansen rolling stock, Green cars also adopted 2+2 seating, matching standard-class layouts. Seat pitch was 1,160 millimetres (46 in) in Green class (car 11), 980 mm (39 in) in reserved-seating cars (cars 12–15), and 910 mm (36 in) in non-reserved cars (cars 16 and 17).

During the life-extension refurbishment program carried out between 1999 and 2001, the interiors were also upgraded with new moquette seat coverings. Green cars received blue moquette, reserved-seating cars received red moquette, and non-reserved seating cars were fitted with turquoise moquette.

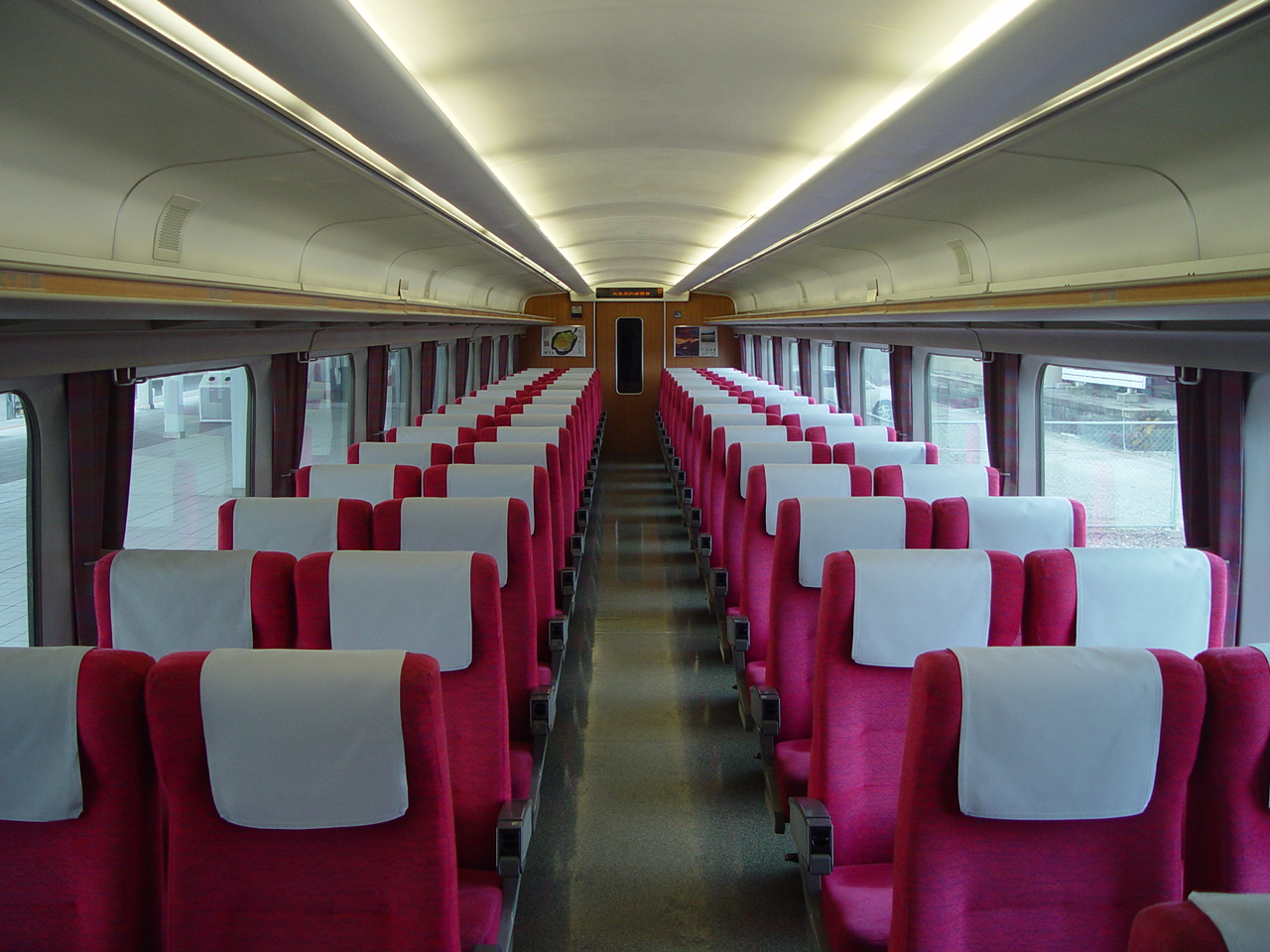
Refurbished standard-class reserved-seating car

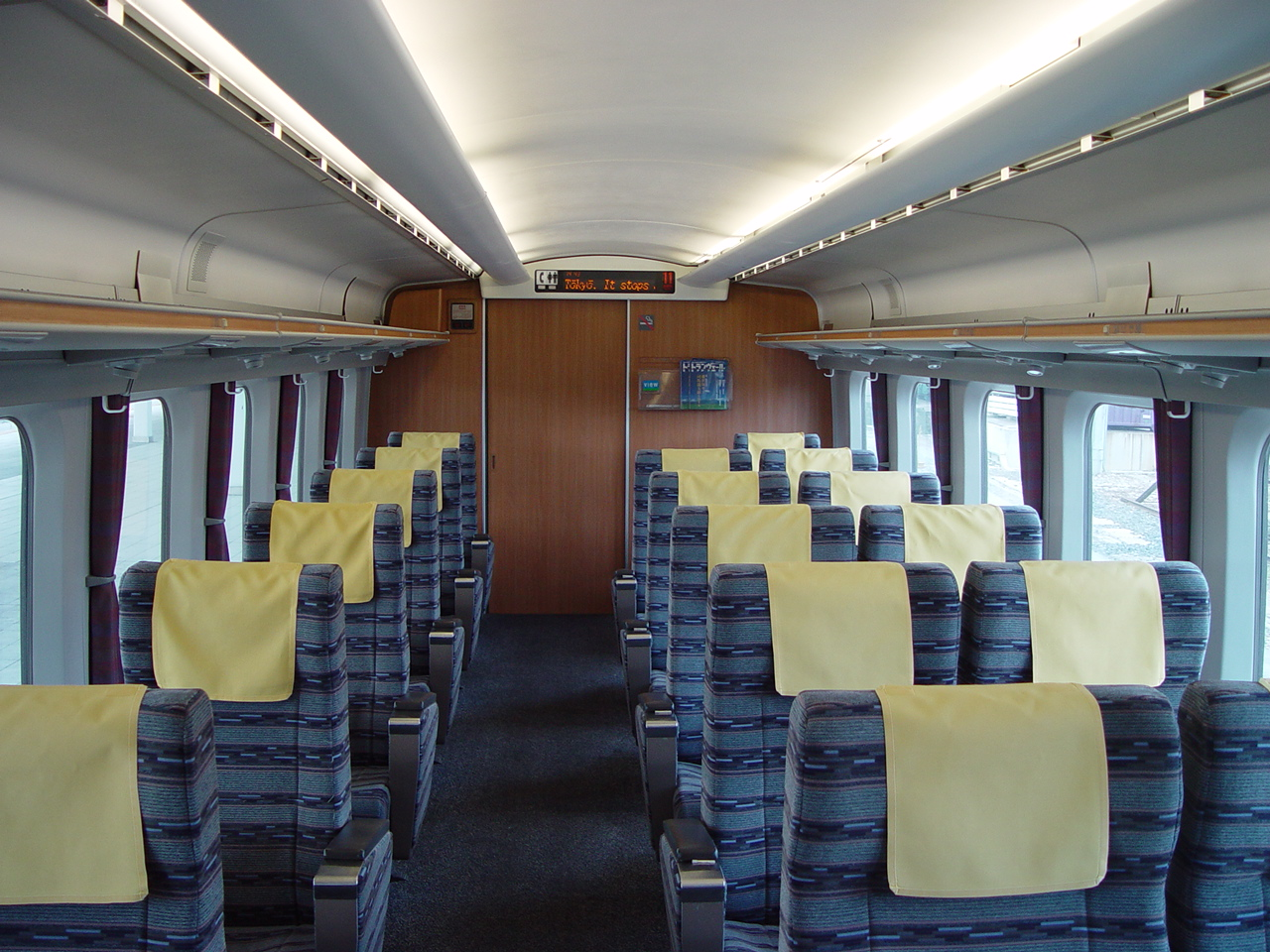
Refurbished Green car seating

== See also ==
- List of high speed trains
