= Jimmachi Station =

Railway station in Higashine, Yamagata Prefecture, Japan

Jimmachi Station 神町駅
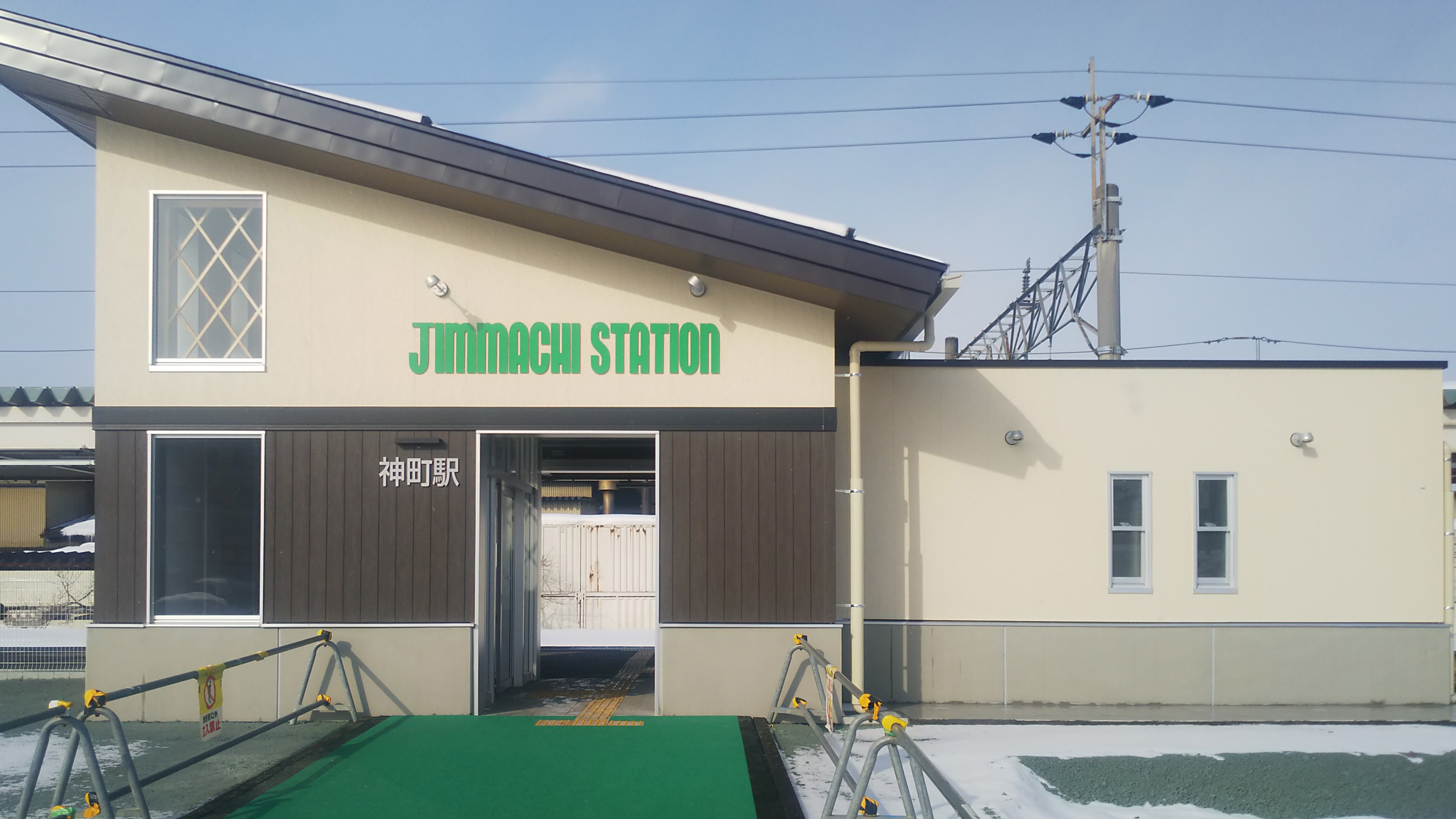
- Jimmachi Station in February 2018

General information
- Location: 1 Jimmachi-chūō, Higashine-shi, Yamagata-ken 999-3763; Japan
- Coordinates: 38°24′46″N 140°22′43″E
- Operator: JR East
- Line: ■ Ōu Main Line
- Distance: 106.3 km from Fukushima
- Platforms: 1 side platform
- Tracks: 1

Other information
- Status: Unstaffed
- Website: Official website

History
- Opened: 23 August 1901

Services
| Preceding station | JR East | Following station |
|---|---|---|
| Midaregawa towards Fukushima | Yamagata Line | Sakurambo-Higashine towards Shinjō |
Location
- Location within Yamagata Prefecture Location within Japan

Jimmachi Station (神町駅, Jimmachi-eki) is a railway station in the city of Higashine, Yamagata Prefecture, Japan, operated by East Japan Railway Company (JR East).

== Lines ==
Jimmachi Station is served by the Ōu Main Line, and is located 106.3 kilometers from the starting point of the line at Fukushima Station.

== Station layout ==
The station originally had one island platform and one side platform; however, with the completion of the Yamagata Shinkansen, the island platform was removed to make way for tracks for the non-stop shinkansen services, leaving the station with a single side platform for a bi-directional track. The station is unattended.

== History ==
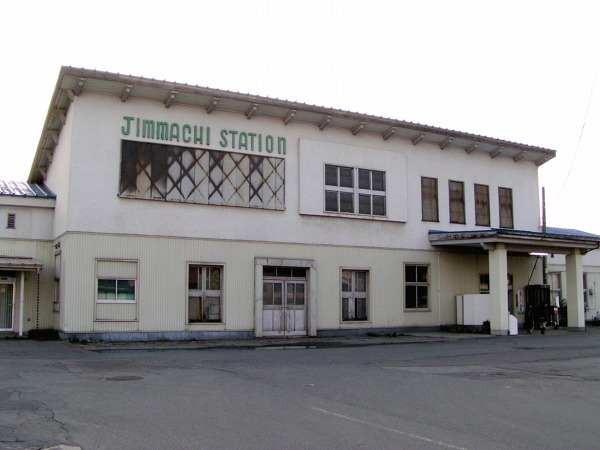
Jimmachi Station in May 2005, before rebuilding

Jimmachi Station opened on August 23, 1901. The station was absorbed into the JR East network upon the privatization of Japanese National Railways (JNR) on April 1, 1987.

== Surrounding area ==
- Yamagata Airport
- JGSDF Camp Jinmachi
- National Route 13
- National Route 48
- National Route 287

== See also ==
- List of railway stations in Japan
