= 511th Infantry Regiment =

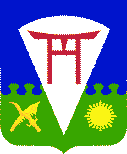
- 511th Infantry Regiment Coat of Arms
- Active: 1943–1958; 1963-1965; 1993–1995; 1997–2005; 2026–present
- Country: United States
- Branch: United States Army
- Type: Airborne forces
- Role: Parachute infantry
- Size: Regiment
- Part of: 2nd Mobile Brigade Combat Team (Airborne), 11th Airborne Division
- Motto: Strength From Above
- Anniversaries: Formed: January 1943
- Engagements: World War II: Battle of Leyte; Battle of Luzon; Raid at Los Baños; Gypsy Task Force - Aparri
- Decorations: The Presidential Unit Citation (PUC) Philippine Presidential Unit Citation Badge

Commanders
- Notable commanders: Orin D. Haugen; Edward H. Lahti

Insignia
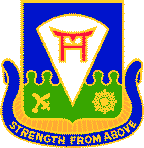
- Distinctive unit insignia

- Original 511th Airborne Background Trimming

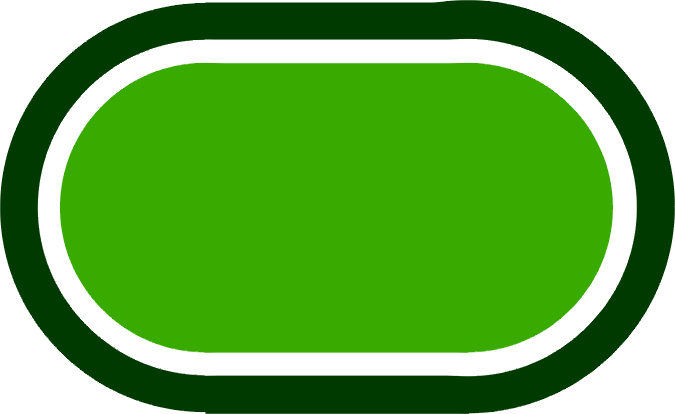
- Current 511th airborne background trimming (1993–present)

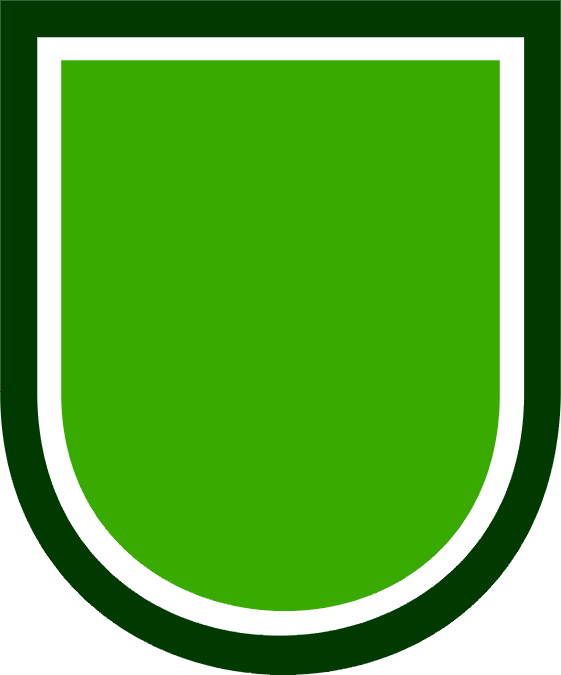
- 511th Infantry Regiment Beret Flash

The 511th Infantry Regiment is an airborne infantry regiment of the United States Army, first activated during World War II under Colonel Orin D. "Hard Rock" Haugen. It formed the parachute infantry element of the 11th Airborne Division. The full history of the regiment is the subject of the book, When Angels Fall: From Toccoa to Tokyo, the 511th Parachute Infantry Regiment in World War II (2019) by author and historian Jeremy C. Holm whose grandfather served in the regiment's Company D during the war.

1st Battalion of the 511th Infantry Regiment was reactivated on 16th July 2026 with the reflagging of 1st Squadron, 40th Cavalry Regiment, part of the 2nd Mobile Brigade Combat Team (Airborne), 11th Airborne Division modernization.

== Activation and Training ==
The 511th PIR was formed at Camp Toccoa, GA, in January 1943 and in March transferred to Camp Mackall, NC before heading to Fort Benning, GA, battalion by battalion for jump training. After the difficulties encountered by Allied airborne operations during Operation Husky in July 1943, from 6–10 December the 511th PIR took part in the successful Knollwood Maneuver that secured the future of American airborne units. After final examination at Camp Polk, LA, the regiment proceeded to Camp Stoneman, CA, and in May 1944 embarked for the Pacific on the troop transport SS Sea Pike. It trained at Dobodura Airfield Complex in Oro Province, Papua New Guinea until November 1944, when it was sent to the Philippines to join the Battle of Leyte.

== Philippines ==
Initially the regiment was tasked with a "reconnaissance en force" operation, but their orders changed to take and hold the passes through the mountains in the center of the island, and engage and reduce the Japanese forces in the area, ultimately in support of the battle of Ormoc which was simultaneously ongoing. The 511th successfully performed this mission during harsh monsoonal weather in the steep, heavily forested terrain, emerging shortly after Christmas of 1944 onto the Ormoc plain after suffering severe casualties.

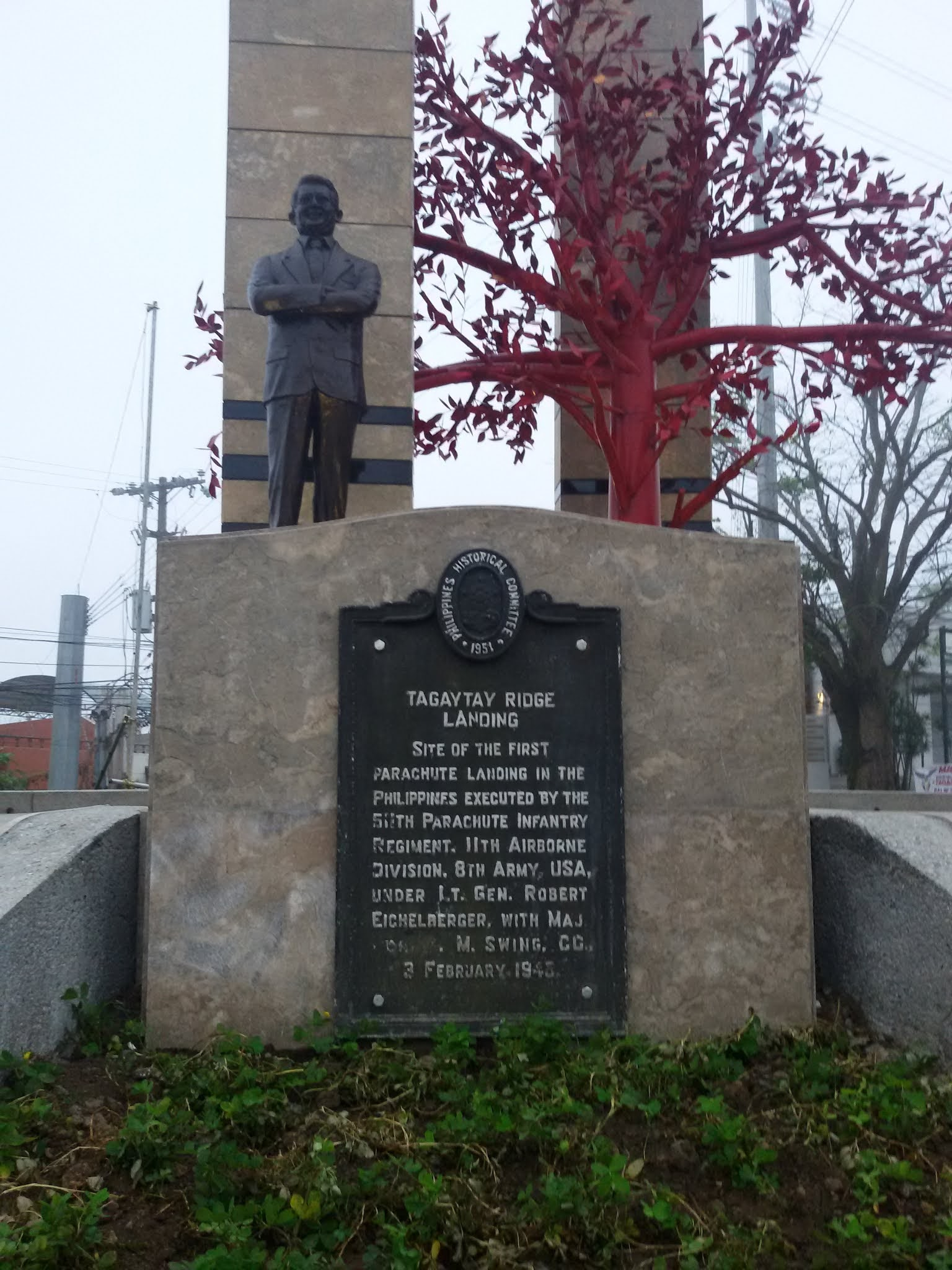
Philippines Historical Committee historical marker installed in Tagaytay in 1951 commemorating the landing of the regiment in Tagaytay

After a brief rest and resupply the regiment was sent to the island of Mindoro as the 11th Airborne was preparing for its part in the Battle of Luzon. On 3 February 1945 the 511th on board 48 C-47 aircraft performed a combat jump on Tagaytay Ridge. Due to the shortage of planes, the regiment and its associated elements jumped in 3 echelons. Despite some misdrops, the 511th assembled successfully at its drop zone at the Manila Hotel Annex on Tagaytay Ridge and proceeded in battalions north towards Manila, encountering occasional Japanese resistance in the towns of Imus and Las Piñas before engaging the Japanese at the Parañaque River just south of Manila.

During the Battle of Manila, the 511th fought through the Japanese Genko Line from 5–12 February, penetrating as far into Manila as the Dewey-Libertad area, before turning east to attack and recapture Fort William McKinley (Fort Bonifacio, now Bonifacio Global City). On 23 February its 1st Battalion took part in the Raid at Los Baños, freeing over 2,000 foreign Allied civilians from a Japanese internment camp south of Manila, with its B Company performing a parachute jump on the camp itself.

The regiment proceeded to clear a transport corridor from Manila to the towns of Lipa and Batangas City, which has an important port, and took the crossroads town of Santo Tomas. With the rest of the 11th Airborne it also engaged Japanese forces throughout the provinces of Laguna, Batangas, and Tayabas (modern Quezon); the regiment's 1st and 2nd battalions in Sixth Army reserve in the towns of Batangas and Bauan, its 3nd battalion in active fighting. From 27 to 29 April it engaged and eliminated the remaining Japanese forces entrenched in underground complexes in the Mount Malepunyo (Malarayat) range east of Lipa.

On 23 June elements of the regiment took part in the war's final combat jump at Aparri in northern Luzon, part of the effort to seal off the retreat of Japanese commander General Yamashita. The regiment remained in the Lipa-Batangas area, training for the planned invasion of Japan, until the atomic bombings of Hiroshima and Nagasaki.

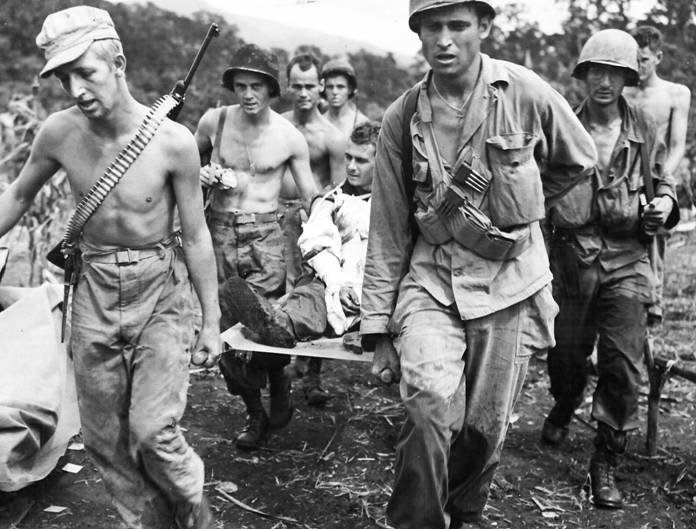
Troops of the 511th Parachute Infantry Regiment evacuate a wounded soldier to an aid station at Manarawat on the island of Leyte, December 1944.

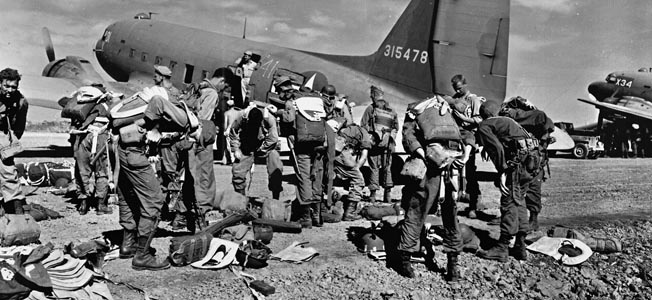
Paratroopers of the 511th Parachute Infantry Regiment prepare for their combat jump on Tagaytay Ridge, 3 February 1945.

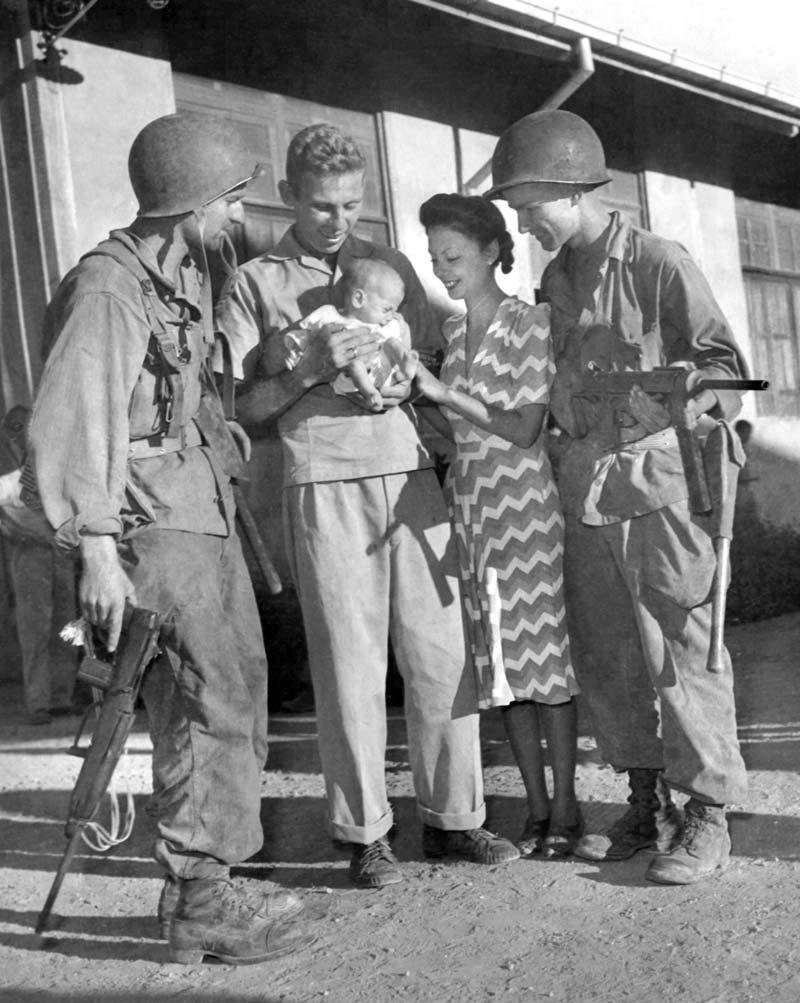
Los Baños internees with 11th Airborne paratroopers after the raid, 23 February 1945.

== Japan ==
After the surrender of Japan, the 511th under Colonel Edward H. Lahti went with the 11th Airborne Division as the first Allied unit to land on Japan. After securing the Atusgi Air Base near Yokohama on 30 August 1945, for General Douglas MacArthur's arrival, the regiment took up defensive positions before being tasked with guarding the departure docks for the Surrender Ceremony on board the USS Missouri. On 2 September the 11th Airborne's Division Band was on hand to greet the debarking 1st Cavalry Division with the strains of "The Old Grey Mare." The 511th was later sent to northern Honshū to perform occupation duty.

On 16 September 1945 the 511th moved to Morioka, Japan to begin the occupation of Iwate and Aomori Prefectures in Northern Honshu. In February 1949, the Regiment except for the 3rd Battalion departed Camp Haugen and returned to the United States via the Panama Canal and arrived in New Orleans in March 1949, from where it moved to Camp Campbell, Kentucky. The 3rd Battalion remained in Camp Haugen until April 1949, when it departed for the United States.

== Germany ==
In March 1956 the 511th (as part of the 11th Airborne Division) crossed the Atlantic into Europe to replace the 5th Infantry Division at Augsburg, Germany during Operation Gyroscope.

== Inactivation ==
In 1957 the 11th Airborne Division was reorganized into a Pentomic division, which included inactivating its three infantry regiments (188th, 503d and 511th) and replacing them with five battle groups, effective 1 March 1957. The battle groups were:

- 1st Airborne Battle Group, 187th Infantry
- 2d Airborne Battle Group, 502d Infantry
- 1st Airborne Battle Group, 503d Infantry
- 2d Airborne Battle Group, 504th Infantry
- 2d Airborne Battle Group, 505th Infantry

Like the 188th, the 511th was not active during the Pentomic era.

This new configuration for the 11th Airborne Division lasted only until 1 July 1958 when it was reorganized and reflagged as the 24th Infantry Division. Three of the battle groups were reflagged with non-Airborne regimental designations while 1-187th and 1-503d temporarily remained assigned to the 24th. On 7 January 1959 1-503d was reassigned to the 82d Airborne Division at Fort Bragg, North Carolina, followed by 1-187th on 8 February 1959. Both battle groups were replaced in the 24th with non-Airborne battle groups.

== Air Assault ==
On 1 February 1963 the 11th Airborne Division was reactivated at Fort Benning, Georgia and on 15 February 1963 it was redesignated as the 11th Air Assault Division (Test). The division, formed as a test bed for the airmobile concept, not a deployable unit, included no more than three infantry battalions at a time:

- 1st Battalion (Airborne), 187th Infantry (1 Feb 64 to 30 Jun 65)
- 3rd Battalion (Airborne), 187th Infantry (1 Feb 63 to 1 Feb 64)
- 1st Battalion (Airborne), 188th Infantry
- 1st Battalion (Airborne), 511th Infantry

For larger exercises the 11th "borrowed" units from the 2nd Infantry Division, also stationed at Fort Benning.

At the end of June 1965 the personnel and equipment of the 11th AAD(T) and the 2nd Infantry Division were merged to become the 1st Cavalry Division (Airmobile). Concurrently the colors of the 2nd were transferred to Korea to reflag the existing 1st Cavalry Division as the 2nd Infantry Division while the colors of the 1st Cavalry Division were transferred to Fort Benning. The 1st Battalion (Abn), 511th Infantry was reflagged as the 2nd Battalion (Abn), 8th Cavalry, while the 1st Battalion (Abn), 188th Infantry was reflagged as the 1st Battalion (Abn), 8th Cavalry, and the 1st Battalion (Abn), 187th Infantry, was reflagged as the 1st Battalion (Abn), 12th Cavalry, all units of the 1st Brigade, 1st Cavalry Division.

== Company A ==
On 1 June 1993, Company A, 511th Infantry was reactivated at Fort Rucker, Alabama to serve as pathfinders by reflagging the existing Company C, 509th Infantry. The company was inactivated in November 1995 and the pathfinder mission discontinued, along with the Air Assault course for which the company provided instructors, due to budget and manpower ceiling cuts. On 1 October 1997, Company A, 511th Infantry was reactivated as a test company for the Enhanced Fiber Optic Guided Missile (EFOGM) system, under the command of Captain Stephen Inouye at Fort Bragg, North Carolina. It was the first and only EFOGM company in the world. On 28 July 2005, Captain Mark Chandler cased the colors during the inactivation ceremony at Rose Field in Fort Bragg, North Carolina.

== Other sources ==
- Flanagan, Lt. Gen. E. M. Jr. The Angels: A history of the 11th Airborne Division. 1989 Presidio Press.
- Holm, Jeremy C. "When Angels Fall: The 511th Parachute Infantry Regiment in World War II MacArthur’s Secret Weapon & Heroes of Los Baños" 2019 Amazon
