= Air Patrol =

Air Patrol may refer to:

== Films ==
- Air Patrol (film), a 1962 American drama film
- The Air Patrol, a 1928 American drama film

== Military ==
- Combat air patrol, a type of military flying mission
- Civil Air Patrol, the civilian auxiliary for the United States Air Force
- Air Patrol Squadron 2 (JMSDF), a unit in the Japan Maritime Self-Defence Force
- Air Patrol Squadron 3 (JMSDF), a unit in the Japan Maritime Self-Defence Force

== See also ==
- Maritime patrol aircraft
- Patrol
