= 6th Division (Japan) =

- 6th Division Distinctive Unit Insignia
- Active: 15 August 1962 – present
- Country: Japan
- Branch: Japan Ground Self-Defense Force
- Type: Infantry division
- Size: 7000
- Part of: North Eastern Army
- Garrison/HQ: Higashine

Commanders
- Current commander: Lt. Gen. Akira Kawasaki

The 6th Division (第6師団, Dai-roku Shidan) is one of nine active divisions of the Japan Ground Self-Defense Force. The division has been subordinated to the North Eastern Army and is headquartered at JGSDF Camp Jinmachi, in Higashine, Yamagata Prefecture, in northern Japan. Its responsibility is the defense of Fukushima, Miyagi and, Yamagata prefectures.

The division was raised on 15 August 1962. The division contributed 500 troops to the Japanese Iraq Reconstruction and Support Group under the United Nations in 2004.

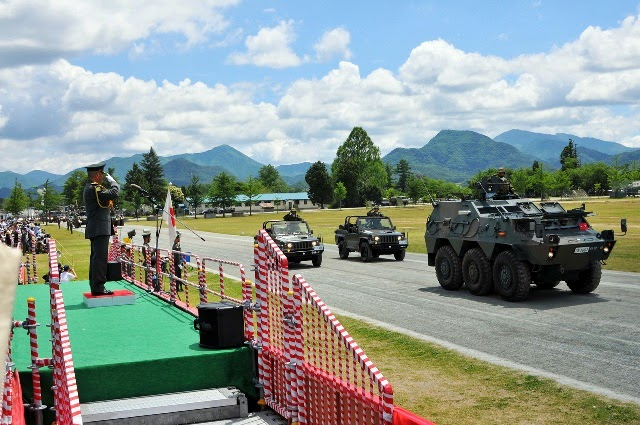
Watching march of the 51st anniversary of the 6th Division · 57th anniversary of the Kami Town Residential Area (June 23, 2013)

== Organization ==
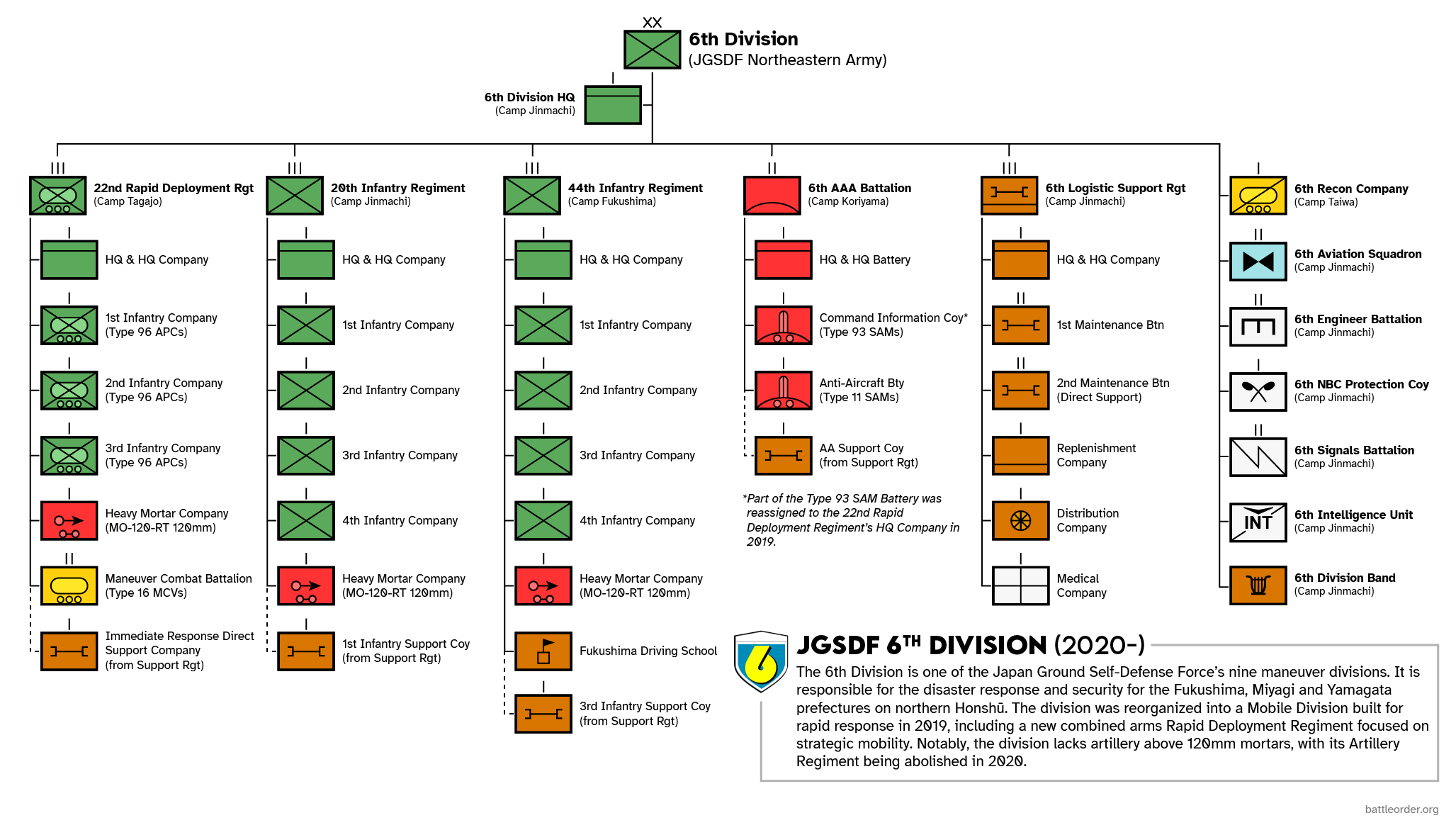
JGSDF 6th Division organization in 2022

- 6th Division, in Higashine
  - 6th Division HQ, in Higashine
  - 20th Infantry Regiment ^{note 1}, in Higashine, with four infantry and one heavy mortar company
  - 22nd Rapid Deployment Regiment, in Tagajō, with 1x headquarters, three Type 96 armored personnel carrier, 1x 120mm F1 mortar, and 1x Type 16 maneuver combat vehicle company
  - 44th Infantry Regiment, in Fukushima, with four infantry and one heavy mortar company
  - 6th Anti-Aircraft Artillery Battalion, in Kōriyama, with a Type 81 and a Type 93 surface-to-air missile squadron
  - 6th Engineer Battalion (Combat), in Higashine
  - 6th Signal Battalion, in Higashine
  - 6th Reconnaissance Company, in Taiwa, with Type 87 armored reconnaissance vehicles
  - 6th Intelligence Company, in Higashine, with ScanEagle
  - 6th Aviation Squadron, at Yamagata Airport, flying UH-1J and OH-6D helicopters
  - 6th NBC Protection Company, in Higashine
  - 6th Logistic Support Regiment, in Higashine
    - 1st Maintenance Battalion
    - 2nd Maintenance Battalion
    - Supply Company
    - Medical Company
    - Transport Company

note 1: Infantry regiments have only battalion strength.
