= JGSDF Camp Jinmachi =

Military base in Yamagata Prefecture, Japan

- 神町駐屯地
- Higashine, Yamagata, Japan
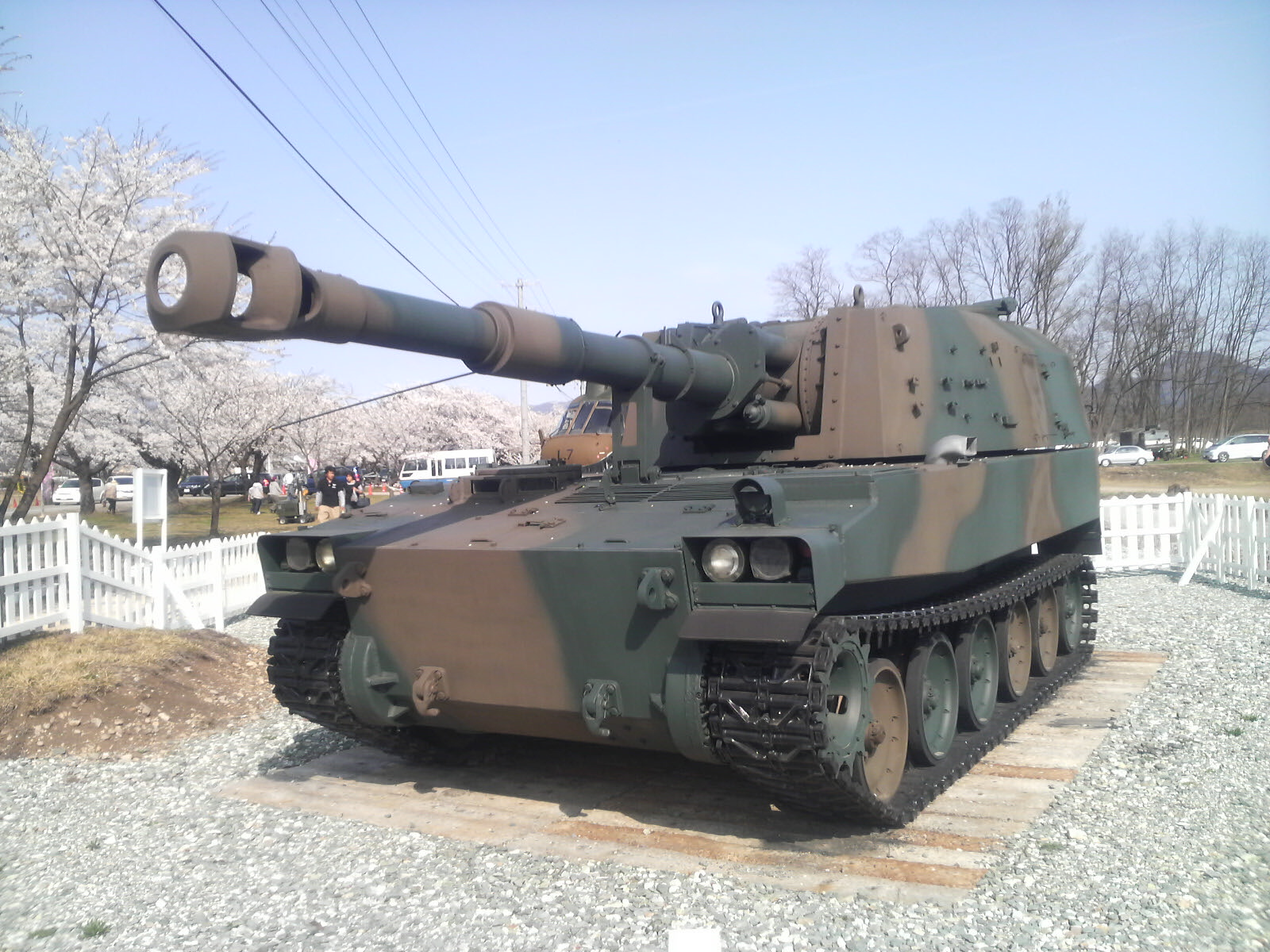
- Type 75 self-propelled howitzer at Camp Jinmachi

Site information
- Owner: 1942-1945 Imperial Japanese Navy; 1945-1956 United States Army; 1956-present Japan Ground Self-Defense Force
- Controlled by: Japan Ground Self-Defense Force

Location
- Location within Yamagata Prefecture Location within Japan
- Coordinates: 38°24′07″N 140°23′57″E

Garrison information
- Garrison: JGSDF 6th Division

JGSDF Camp Jinmachi (神町駐屯地, Jinmachi-chūtonchi) is a military base of the Japan Ground Self-Defense Force, located in Higashine, Yamagata prefecture, Japan.

== History ==
In 1942, the Imperial Japanese Navy Air Service established a training facility known as the Jimmachi Naval Air Base. The facilities were taken over by the United States Army in 1945 after the surrender of Japan following World War II. The base was initially occupied by the 674th Airborne Artillery Battalion of the 11th Airborne Division and named Camp Younghans after 1st Lt Raymond M Younghans who was killed in action on 31 March 1945 on Luzon in the Philippines. The base was home to the 48th and 49th Field Artillery Battalions of the 7th Infantry Division along with a number of other American Army units until September 1950, when the bulk of American forces were redeployed to Korea for the Korean War.

From September 1954, all of the American artillery units formerly based in Hokkaido were relocated to Camp Younghans, including the 61st, 77th, 82nd and 99th Artillery Battalions of the 1st Cavalry Division.

The base was returned to the control of Japan in 1956. The same year, the JGDSF’s first mountaineering regiment was established at Ōtawara, Tochigi in the Nasu Mountains. This regiment was elevated to form the basis of the JGSDF 6th Division on 15 August 1962, with responsibility for the defense of Fukushima, Miyagi and Yamagata prefectures. The headquarters of the new division was JGSDF Camp Jinmachi.

== Organization ==
JGSDF North East Army (HQ Sendai)

- 6th Division HQ
  - 20th Infantry Regiment ^{note 1}
  - 6th Combat Engineering Battalion
  - 6th Signals Battalion
  - 6th Aviation Squadron, at Yamagata Airport, flying UH-1J and OH-6D helicopters
  - 6th NBC Protection Battalion
  - 6th Logistic Support Regiment
