= JGSDF Camp Hachinohe =

JGSDF Camp Hachinohe 八戸駐屯地
- Hachinohe, Aomori, Japan

Site information
- Type: Military Base
- Controlled by: Japan Ground Self-Defense Force

Site history
- Built: 1941
- In use: 1941-1945 Imperial Japanese Army; 1945-1956 United States Army; 1956-present Japan Ground Self-Defense Force

Hachinohe Air Field
- IATA: none; ICAO: RJSH

Summary
- Airport type: Military
- Operator: Japan Ground Self-Defense Force
- Location: Hachinohe, Japan
- Elevation AMSL: 152 ft (46 m)
- Coordinates: 40°33′24″N 141°27′58″E
- Interactive map of Hachinohe Air Field

Runways
Direction	Length		Surface
Direction	m	ft	Surface
06/24	640	2,100	Concrete
11/29	360	1,181	Concrete
- Source: Japanese AIP at AIS Japan

JGSDF Camp Hachinohe (八戸駐屯地, Hachinohe-chūtonchi) is a military base of the Japan Ground Self-Defense Force in Hachinohe, Aomori Prefecture, Japan. It is one of several military facilities in eastern Aomori Prefecture, and is adjacent to the JMSDF Hachinohe Air Base.

== History ==
Camp Hachinohe was founded as a training field for the Imperial Japanese Army Air Force in 1941. On the surrender of Japan at the end of World War II, the airfield was occupied by the 7th Cavalry Regiment and the 29th AAA AW Battalion of the United States Army as Camp Haugen, in honor of Col. Orin D. Haugen.

With the start of the Korean War in 1950, the base was turned over to the National Police Reserve, the immediate predecessor to the Japan Ground Self-Defense Force. With the final withdrawal of American forces from Hachinohe in 1956, the base was turned over to the JGSDF and was officially re-designated JGSDF Camp Hachinohe. In 1962, the JGSDF 38th Infantry Regiment and JGSDF 39th Infantry Regiment were created at Hachinohe. The JGSDF 39th Infantry Regiment was transferred to JGSDF Camp Hirosaki in 1968 and the JGSDF 38th Infantry Regiment to JGSDF Camp Tagajō in Akita Prefecture in 1994.

In 2006, the JGSDF North Eastern Army Combined Brigade was formed, with units split between Camp Hachinohe and Camp Tagajō. At present, the base is home to 19 operational units, one aviation unit, and 2100 men.

== Organization ==
JGSDF North East Army (HQ Sendai)

- JGSDF 4th Surface-to-Surface Missile Regiment
- JGSDF 5th Antiaircraft Artillery Group
- JGSDF 9th Antitank Group
- JGSDF 9th Engineer Battalion(Combat)
- JGSDF North Eastern Army Aviation Group (equipped with AH-1 and OH-1 helicopters
- JGSDF 9th Logistic Support Regiment
- JGSDF 38th Infantry Regiment (portions)
- JGSDF North Eastern Army Logistic Support Troop
