= Orin D. Haugen =

US Army officer (1907–1945)

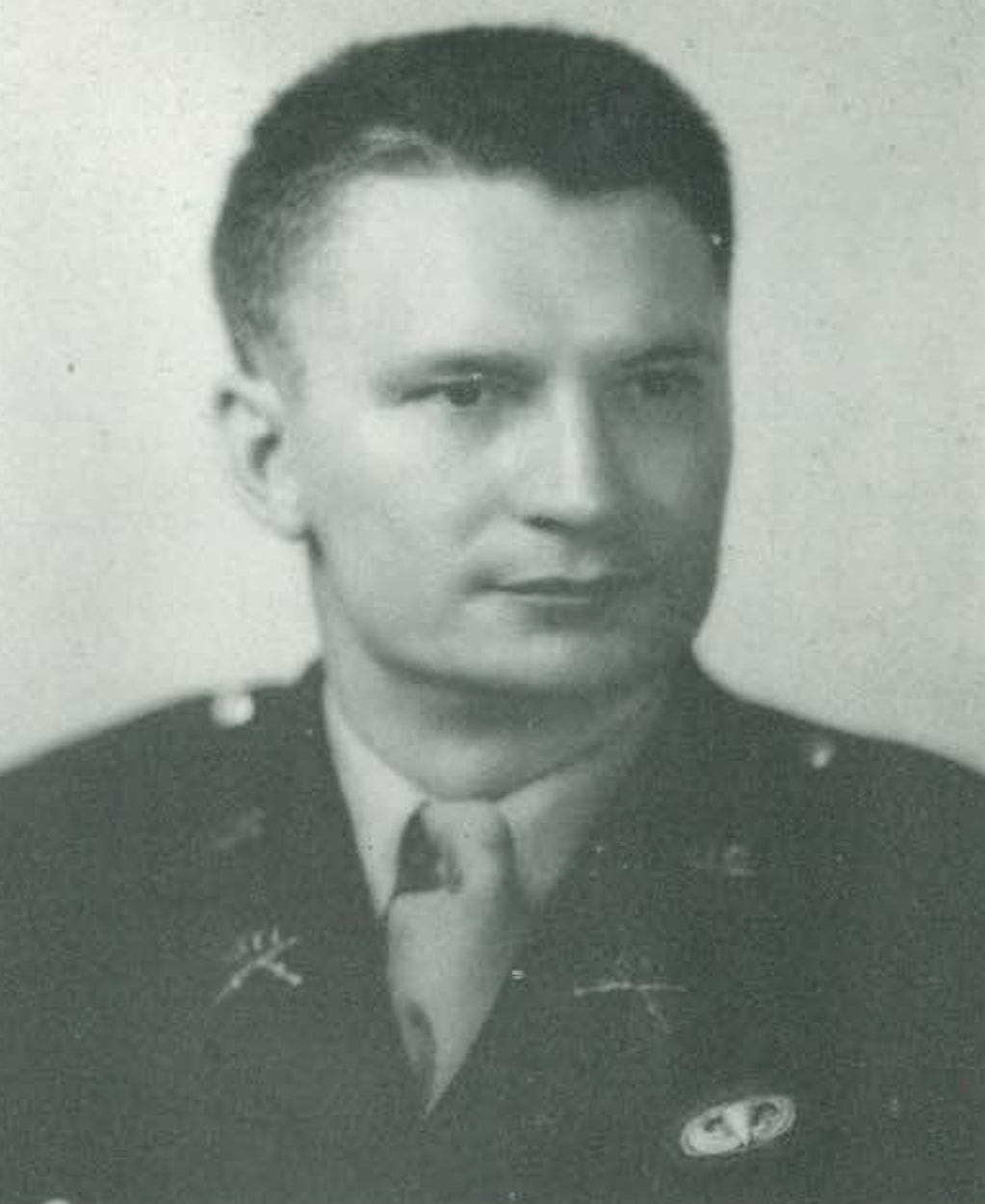
- Haugen as 511th Parachute Infantry Regiment commander c. 1944
- Born: August 18, 1907; Wyndmere, North Dakota
- Died: February 22, 1945 (aged 37); Hollandia, Dutch East Indies
- Burial place: Golden Gate National Cemetery
- Military career
- Allegiance: United States
- Branch: United States Army
- Service years: 1930–1945
- Rank: Colonel
- Nickname: Hard Rock
- Unit: Infantry Branch
- Commands: 511th Parachute Infantry Regiment
- Conflicts: World War II; Battle of Leyte; Battle of Luzon; Battle of Manila (1945) †
- Awards: Silver Star; Air Medal; Legion of Merit

Orin Doughty Haugen (August 18, 1907 – February 22, 1945) was a Colonel in the United States Army and commanding officer of the 511th Parachute Infantry Regiment during World War II.

== Career ==
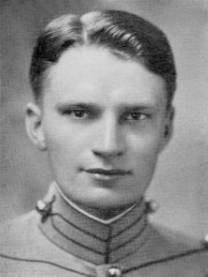
As a West Point cadet c. 1930

Born in Wyndmere, North Dakota, Haugen graduated from the United States Military Academy in 1930. Commissioned into the Infantry Branch, Haugen had a variety of postings and training.

In 1940 he was serving in the 32nd Infantry at Fort Ord, California when he volunteered for the then new United States Parachute Troops. Captain Haugen become commander of "A" Company of the 501st Parachute Infantry Battalion. He later became executive officer of the 505th Parachute Infantry Regiment then became the first regimental commander of the 511th Parachute Infantry.

Orin Haugen died en route to a hospital on New Guinea from wounds sustained during the Battle of Manila, one day before his regiment would rescue POWs under Japanese military control at Los Baños.

== See also ==
- JGSDF Camp Hachinohe

== Other sources ==
- Flanagan, Edward M. (1986) The Los Baños Raid: The 11th Airborne Jumps at Dawn (Presidio Books) ISBN 0891412506
- Flanagan, Edward M (1988) The Angels – A History of the 11th Airborne Division 1943–1946 (The Battery Press) ISBN 0891413588
- Hagerman, Bart (1990) U.S.A. Airborne: 50th Anniversary, 1940-1990 (Turner Publishing Company) ISBN 9780938021902
- Henderson, Bruce (2015) Rescue at Los Baños: The Most Daring Prison Camp Raid of World War II (William Morrow) ISBN 9780062325068
