= Midaregawa Station =

Railway station in Tendō, Yamagata Prefecture, Japan

Midaregawa Station 乱川駅
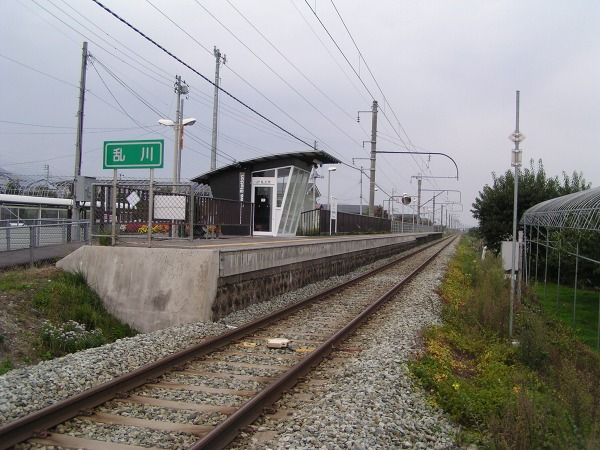
- Midaregawa Station, October 2005

General information
- Location: Midaregawa, Tendō-shi, Yamagata-ken; Japan
- Coordinates: 38°23′14″N 140°22′30″E
- Operator: JR East
- Line: ■ Ōu Main Line
- Distance: 103.4 km from Fukushima
- Platforms: 1 side platform

Other information
- Status: Unstaffed
- Website: Official website

History
- Opened: 1 December 1954

Services
Preceding station	JR East	Following station
Tendō towards Fukushima	Yamagata Line	Jimmachi towards Shinjō
Location
- Location within Yamagata Prefecture Location within Japan

Midaregawa Station (乱川駅, Midaregawa-eki) is a railway station in the city of Tendō, Yamagata, Japan, operated by East Japan Railway Company (JR East).

== Lines ==
Midaregawa Station is served by the Ōu Main Line, and is located 103.4 kilometres (64.2 mi) rail kilometers from the terminus of the line at Fukushima Station.

== Station layout ==
The station has one side platform serving a single bi-directional single track. The station is unattended.

== History ==
Midaregawa Station opened on 1 December 1954. The station was absorbed into the JR East network upon the privatization of JNR on 1 April 1987.

== Surrounding area ==
- Tendo Mokko
- National Route 13

== See also ==
- List of railway stations in Japan
