= North Eastern Army (Japan) =

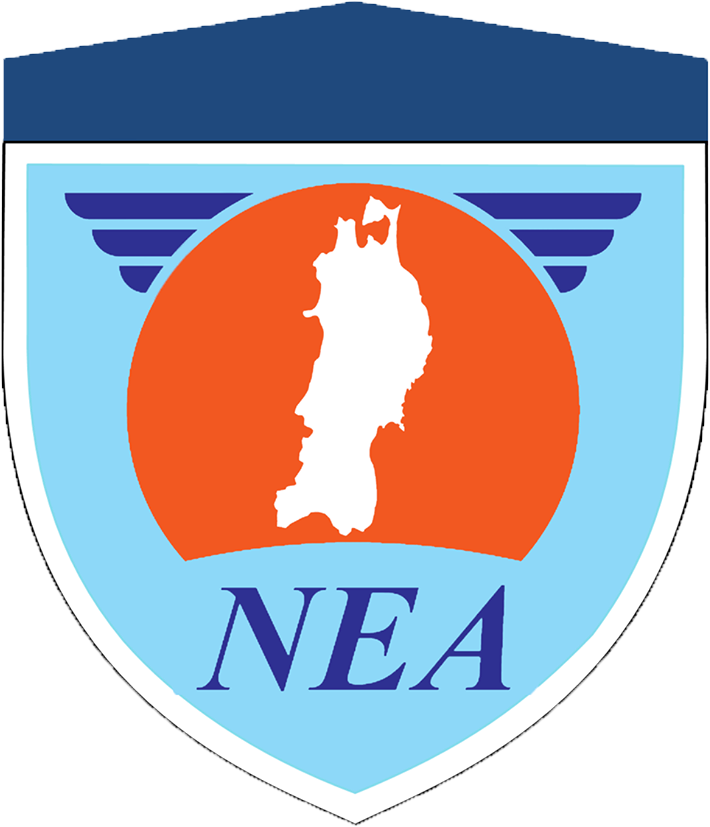
- North Eastern Army Distinctive Unit Insignia
- Active: 14 January 1960 – present
- Country: Japan
- Branch: Japan Ground Self-Defense Force
- Type: Field army
- Garrison/HQ: Camp Sendai, Sendai

Commanders
- Current commander: Lt. Gen. Naoki Kajiwara

The North Eastern Army (東北方面隊, Tōhoku Hōmentai) is one of five active Armies of the Japan Ground Self-Defense Force headquartered in Sendai, Miyagi Prefecture. Its responsibility is the defense of the Tōhoku region.

== Organization ==
- North Eastern Army, in Sendai
  - 6th Division, in Higashine, responsible for the defense of Fukushima, Miyagi and Yamagata prefectures.
    - 20th Infantry Regiment, in Higashine
    - 22nd Rapid Deployment Regiment, in Tagajō
    - 44th Infantry Regiment, in Fukushima
  - 9th Division, in Aomori, responsible for the defense of Akita, Aomori and Iwate prefectures.
    - 5th Infantry Regiment, in Aomori
    - 21st Infantry Regiment, in Akita
    - 39th Infantry Regiment, in Hirosaki
  - North Eastern Army Artillery Regiment, at Camp Iwate, in Takizawa
    - 1st Artillery Battalion, at Camp Kōriyama, in Kōriyama
    - 2nd Artillery Battalion, at Camp Iwate, in Takizawa
    - 3rd Artillery Battalion, at Camp Kōriyama, in Kōriyama
    - 4th Artillery Battalion, at Camp Iwate, in Takizawa
    - Target Acquisition Battery, at Camp Iwate, in Takizawa
  - North Eastern Army Air Corps, in Sendai
    - 110th Aviation Squadron, at Camp Hachinohe, in Hachinohe
    - North Eastern Army Helicopter Battalion, in Sendai
    - North Eastern Army Air Traffic Control and Meteorological Company, in Sendai
    - North Eastern Army Airfield Maintenance Company, in Sendai
  - North Eastern Army Combined (Training) Brigade, in Sendai
    - 38th Infantry Regiment (Reserve), in Tagajō
    - 2nd Non-Commissioned Officer Training Battalion, in Sendai
    - 119th Training Battalion, in Tagajō
  - 2nd Engineer Brigade, in Shibata
    - 10th Engineer Group (Construction), in Shibata
    - 11th Engineer Group (Construction), in Fukushima
    - 104th Equipment Battalion, in Shibata
    - 301st Beach Obstacle Company, in Shibata
    - 312th Vehicle Company, in Shibata
  - North Eastern Army Signal Regiment, in Sendai
    - 102nd Command Post Signals Battalion, in Sendai
    - 103rd Base Systems Signals Battalion, in Sendai
    - 301st Central Signals Company, in Sendai
  - North Eastern Army Logistic Support, in Sendai
    - 102nd Supply Battalion (Reserve), in Sendai
    - 105th Engineer Support Battalion (supports the 2nd Engineer Brigade), in Shibata
    - 108th General Support Battalion (supports the 6th Division and 9th Division), in Sendai
    - North Eastern Army Transport Battalion, in Sendai
    - 301st Ammunition Company (Reserve), in Sendai
    - 301st Infantry Support Company (supports the 38th Infantry Regiment), in Kōriyama
    - 303rd Anti-Aircraft Support Company (supports the 5th Anti-Aircraft Artillery Group), in Hachinohe
    - 303rd Signals Support Company (supports the North Eastern Army Signals Regiment), in Sendai
    - 305th Artillery Support Company (supports the North Eastern Army Artillery Regiment), at Camp Iwate, in Takizawa
    - 307th Artillery Support Company (supports the 4th Surface-to-Ship Missile Regiment), at Camp Hachinohe, in Hachinohe
  - 4th Surface-to-Ship Missile Regiment, at Camp Hachinohe, in Hachinohe (Type 88 surface-to-ship missile)
  - 5th Anti-Aircraft Artillery Group, at Camp Hachinohe, in Hachinohe (MIM-23 Hawk)
  - North Eastern Army Intelligence Corps, in Sendai
  - North Eastern Army Medical Corps, in Sendai
  - North Eastern Army Command Post Training Support Company, in Sendai
  - North Eastern Army Accounting Company, in Sendai
  - North Eastern Army Band, in Sendai

=== North Eastern Army organization graphic ===
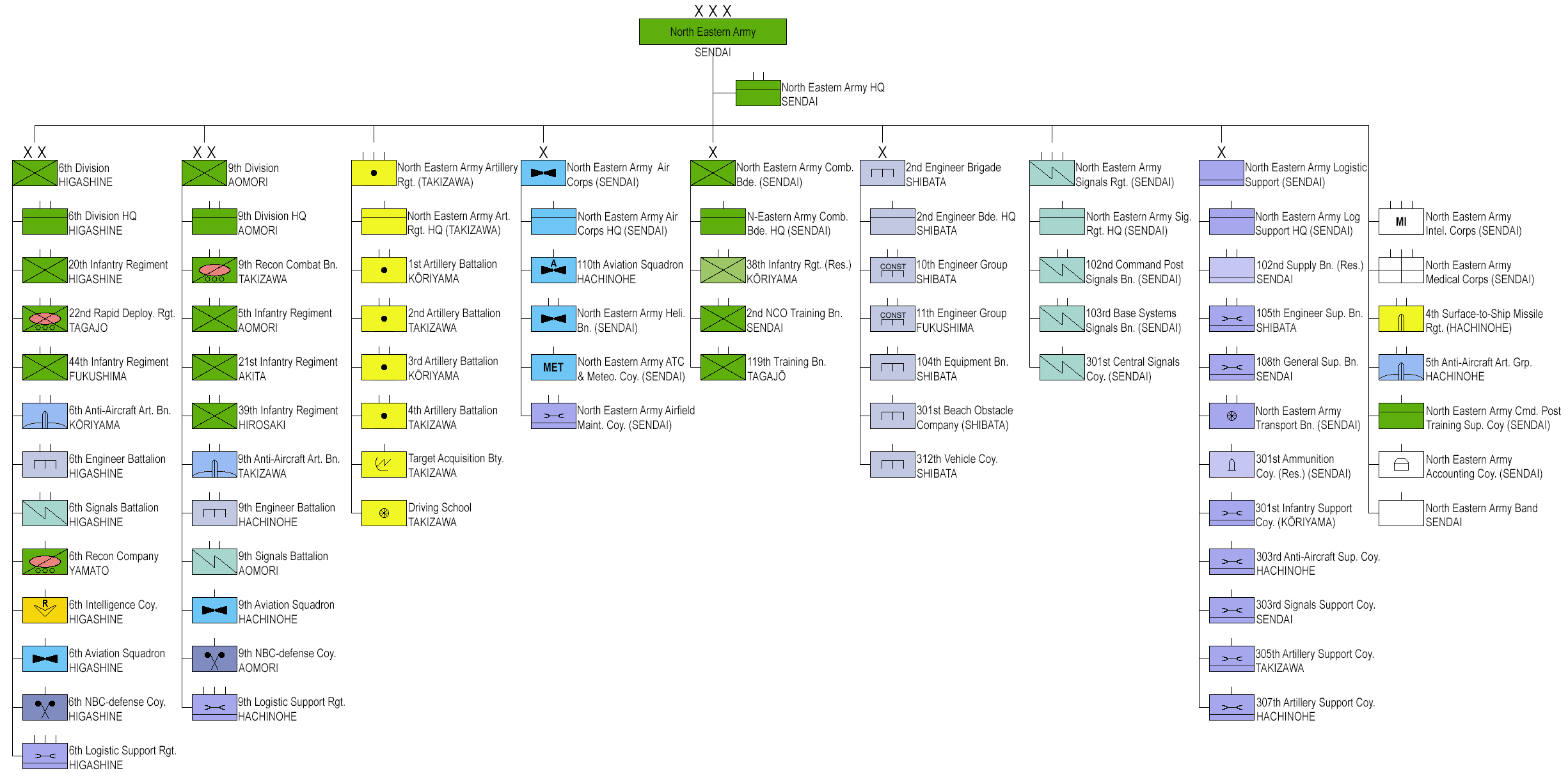
North Eastern Army organization as of March 2026 (click image to enlarge)
