= Air Patrol Squadron 2 (JMSDF) =

- 第2航空隊
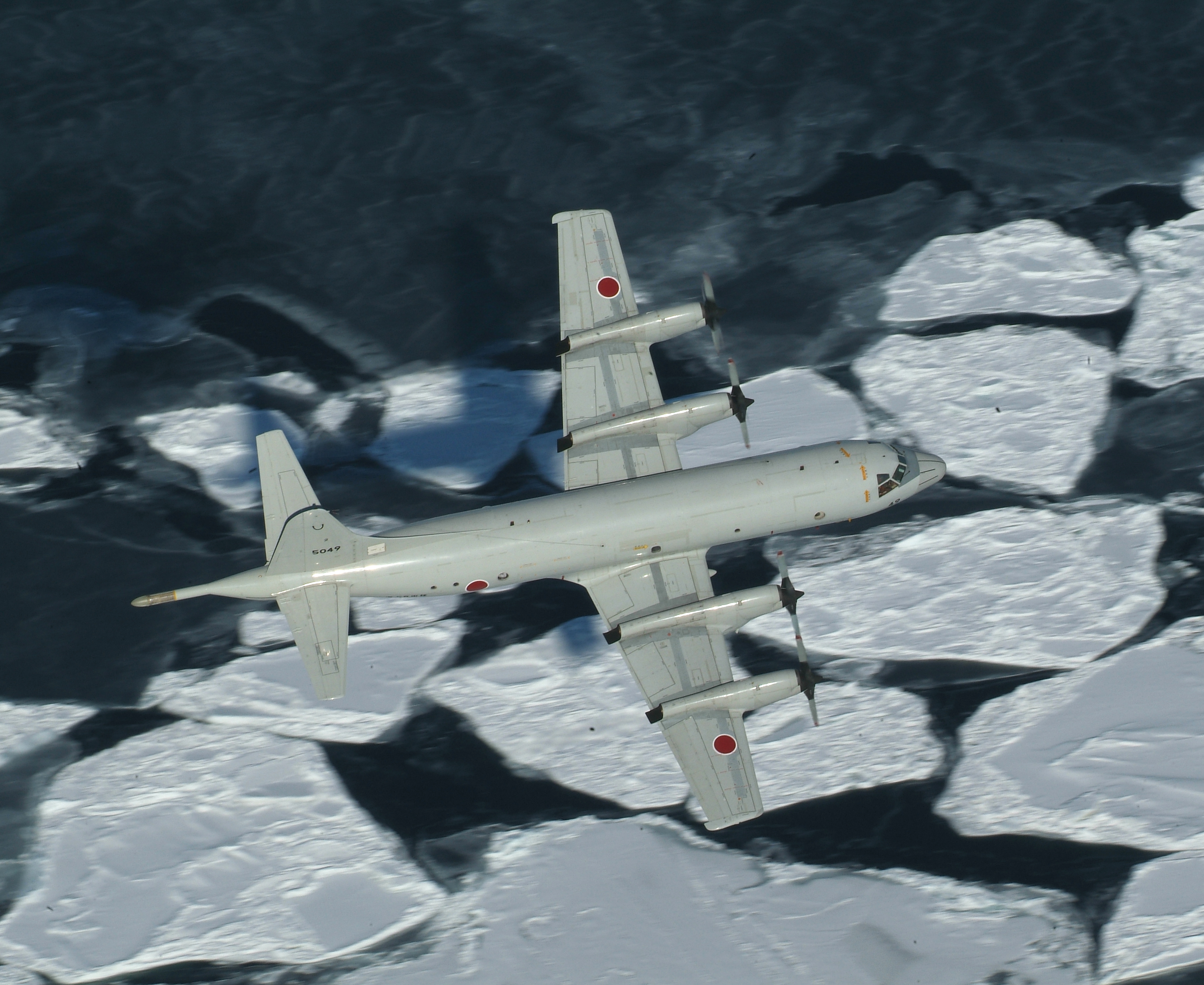
- 2 Sqn P-3C
- Active: 16 March 1957 (As Hachinohe Squadron); 5 August 1958 (As Air Patrol Squadron 2)
- Country: Japan
- Branch: Japan Maritime Self-Defense Force
- Part of: Fleet Air Force, Fleet Air Wing 2
- Garrison/HQ: JMSDF Hachinohe Air Base
- Nickname(s): Odin (from 2008). Previously Poseidon.

Aircraft flown
- Patrol: Lockheed P-3C Orion

Air Patrol Squadron 2 (第2航空隊, dai-ni-sankoukuutai) (also referred to as VP-2 or Fleet Air Squadron 2) is a unit of the Japanese Maritime Self-Defence Force. It is a part of Fleet Air Wing 4 and is based at JMSDF Hachinohe Air Base in Aomori Prefecture. It is equipped with Lockheed P-3C Orion aircraft.

== Squadron structure ==
The squadron comprises two flights, both equipped with P-3 aircraft:

- 21st flight
- 22nd flight

== Aircraft used ==
- Grumman TBF Avenger (1957-1958)
- Lockheed P-2V-7 Neptune (1958-?)
- Lockheed P-2J (1971-?)
- Lockheed P-3C Orion (1986-)
