= JMSDF Hachinohe Air Base =

JMSDF Hachinohe Air Base 八戸航空基地
- IATA: HHE; ICAO: RJSH

Summary
- Airport type: Military
- Operator: Japan Maritime Self-Defense Force
- Location: Hachinohe, Japan
- Elevation AMSL: 152 ft (46 m)
- Coordinates: 40°33′07″N 141°28′02″E

Map
- Location in Japan RJSH (Aomori Prefecture)

Runways
Direction	Length		Surface
Direction	m	ft	Surface
07/25	2,250	7,382	Concrete
- Source: Japanese AIP at AIS Japan

JMSDF Hachinohe Air Base (八戸航空基地, Hachinohe Kōkūkichi) (ICAO: RJSH) is a military aerodrome of the Japan Maritime Self-Defense Force (JMSDF). It is located 3.0 NM (5.6 km; 3.5 mi) northwest of Hachinohe in Aomori Prefecture, in northern Honshū, Japan.

== Operations ==
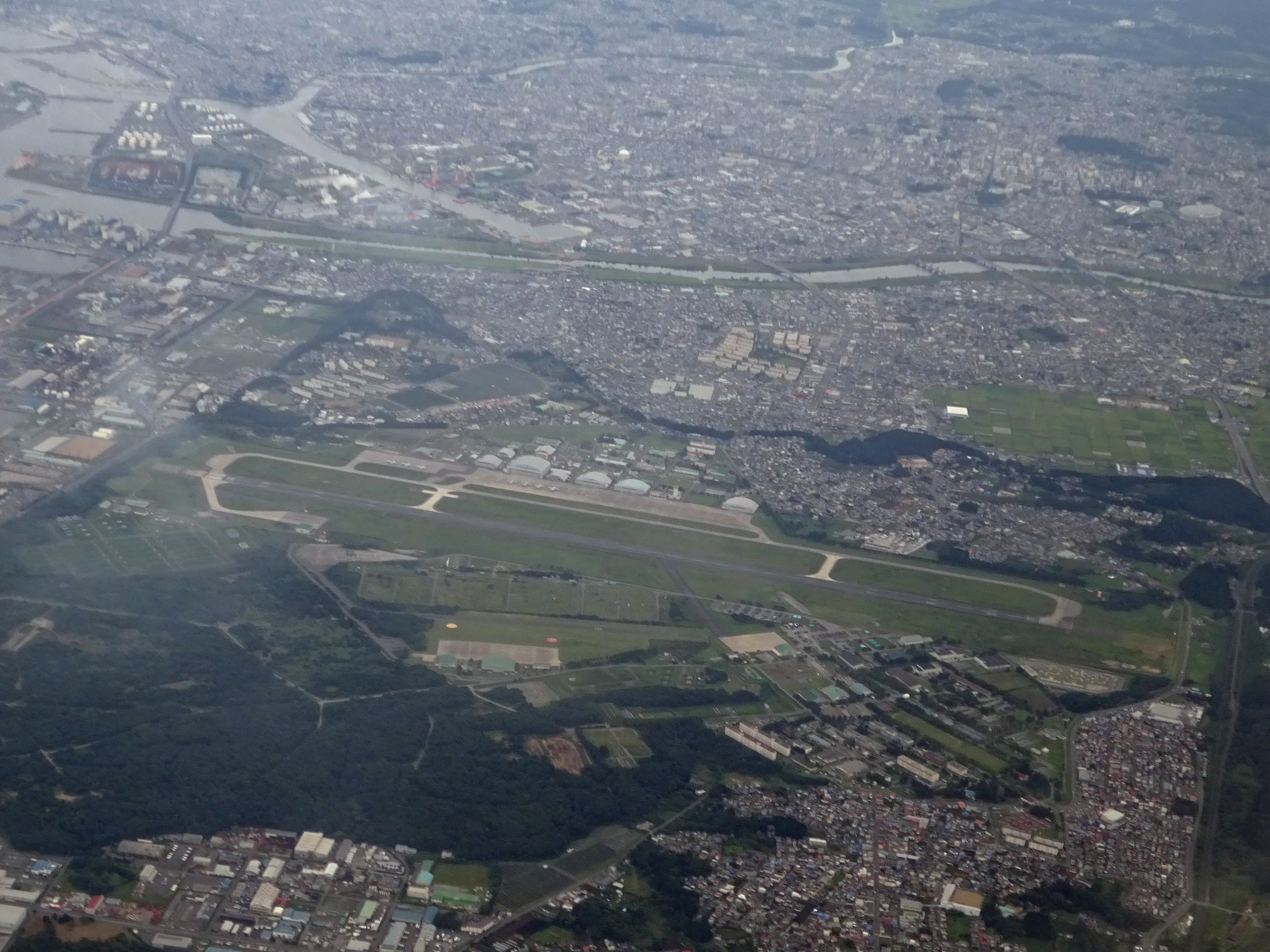
Aerial view of Hachinohe Air Base (2020)

JMSDF Hachinohe Air Base is currently the headquarters of Fleet Air Wing 2's Air Patrol Squadron 2. which is equipped with Kawasaki-Lockheed P-3C Orion maritime patrol aircraft, and which is responsible for patrols of the seaward approaches to northern Japan. Aircraft are regularly dispatched to forward airfields in Hokkaidō, and in wintertime, conduct patrols of drift ice in the Sea of Okhotsk.

JMSDF Hachinohe Air Base is adjacent to JGSDF Camp Hachinohe, and is also in close geographic proximity to Misawa Air Base housing Japan Air Self-Defense Force (JASDF) and United States Air Force units. JMSDF Hachinohe is also the home base for the JMSDF Mobile Construction Group, the Japanese Self-Defense Force's equivalent to the American Seabees.

== History ==
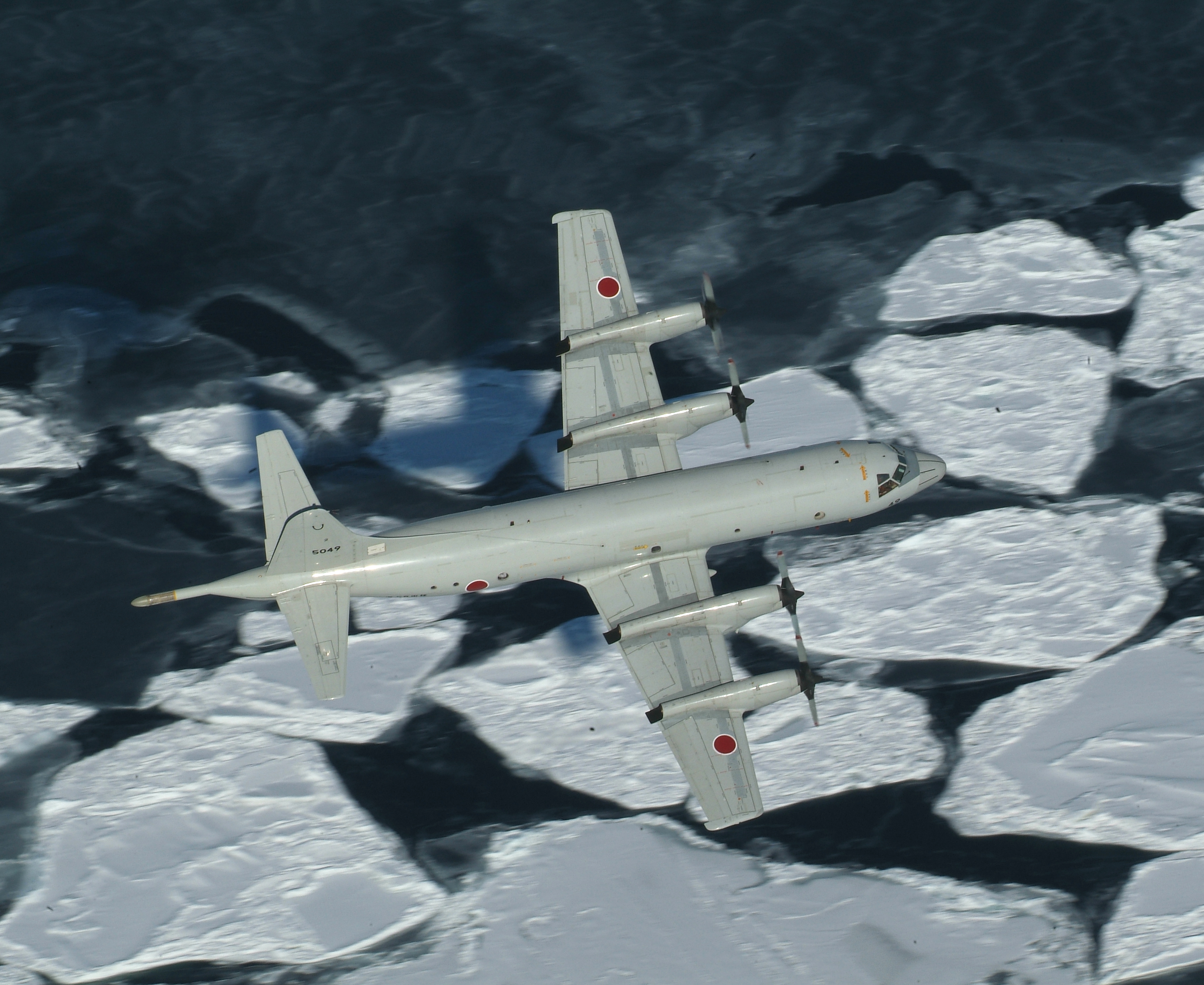
Air Patrol Squadron 2 Lockheed P-3C Orion

JMSDF Hachinohe Air Base was initially founded as a training field for the Imperial Japanese Army Air Force in 1941. On the surrender of Japan at the end of World War II, the air field was occupied by the United States Army. Between 1945 and 1950, it continued in operation by the United States Army under the name Camp Haugen.

With the start of the Korean War in 1950, the base was turned over to the Japanese Coastal Safety Force, the immediate predecessor to the JMSDF. With the final withdrawal of American forces from Hachinohe in 1956, the base was officially designated JGSDF Camp Hachinohe.

The Japan Maritime Self-Defense Force (JMSDF) established a presence from 1957, and the JMSDF Hachinohe Air Wing was renamed Fleet Air Wing Two in 1961. The wing was initially equipped with Lockheed P-2 Neptune, later transitioning to Kawasaki P-2J Neptune aircraft.

In 1963, American authorities banned civilian air traffic to Misawa Air Base, citing safety and security reasons, and commercial air operations were transferred to Hachinohe. In 1963, Air Patrol Squadron 2 was established and reequipped with P-2J Neptune aircraft in 1971. The squadron transitioned to the P-3C Orion in 1985. With the re-opening of Misawa Airport in 1975, commercial operations were transferred back to Misawa. In an administrative reorganization in 2008, UH-60J helicopter operations were transferred to JMSDF Ōminato Air Station.
