= Yamagata Airport =

Airport in Higashine, Yamagata Prefecture, Japan

Yamagata Airport 山形空港
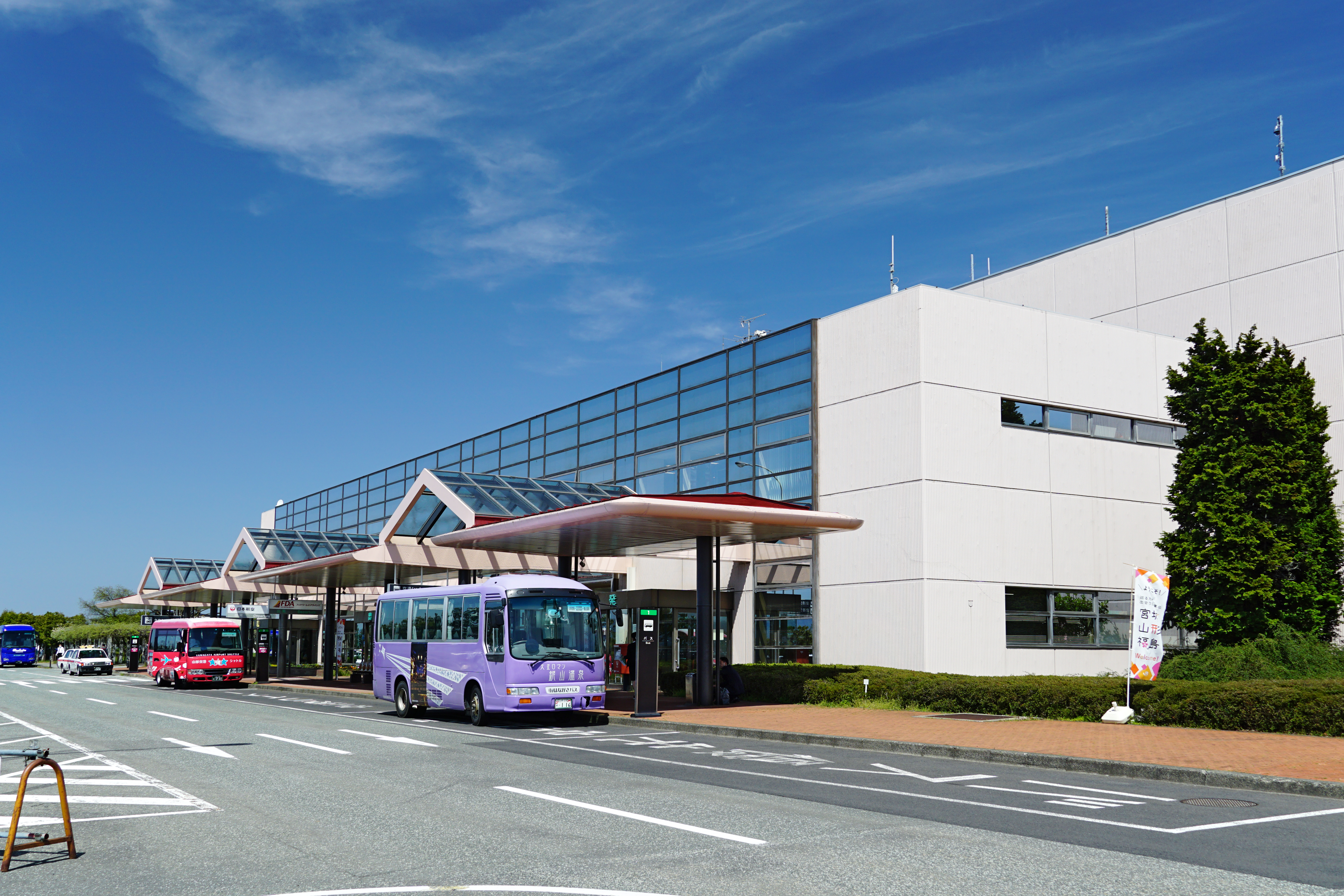
- IATA: GAJ; ICAO: RJSC

Summary
- Airport type: Public / Military
- Serves: Yamagata
- Location: Higashine, Yamagata Prefecture, Japan
- Elevation AMSL: 345 ft (105 m)
- Coordinates: 38°24′43″N 140°22′16″E

Map
- Location in Japan GAJ/RJSC (Japan)

Runways
Direction	Length		Surface
Direction	m	ft	Surface
01/19	2,000	6,562	Asphalt

Statistics (2015)
- Passengers: 223,111
- Cargo (metric tonnes): 0
- Aircraft movement: 6,858
- Source: Japanese Ministry of Land, Infrastructure, Transport and Tourism

Yamagata Airport (山形空港, Yamagata Kūkō) (IATA: GAJ, ICAO: RJSC ) is an airport in Higashine, Yamagata Prefecture, Japan, 23 kilometres (14 mi) north of the city of Yamagata.

== History ==
Kamiyama Training Airfield was opened by the Imperial Japanese Navy in World War II. It was briefly used by the United States military after the war and then by the Japanese Self-Defense Force as a training facility.

In June 1964, it was turned over to civilian control as “Jinmachi Airport” (神町空港), a third-class regional airport. It was renamed Yamagata Airport in 1965. A helicopter detachment from the JGSDF 6th Division has been based at the airport since 1969. The runway was extended to 1500 meters in 1972, and the airport was re-designated as Class-II in 1979. The runway was further extended to 2000 meters in 1981 and a new terminal building completed in 1984.

Regularly scheduled services began in 1964, with All Nippon Airways operating Fokker F.27 service to Tokyo (Haneda). The service was upgraded to YS-11s in 1972 and to Boeing 737s in 1976.

By 1985 ANA offered five daily flights to Haneda, one of which was operated by a widebody Boeing 767. Japan Air System began service to Osaka (Itami) and Sapporo in 1979. International charter service commenced in 1981, and the airport hosted long-haul charters to countries such as Finland, Hungary, New Zealand and Mexico.

The number of passengers using the airport peaked in 1991 and declined precipitously, particularly on the Tokyo route, due to the completion of the Yamagata Shinkansen in 1992. The Tokyo route saw 470,618 passengers in 1991 but was down to 43,447 passengers in 2002. All Nippon Airways suspended the Tokyo service and withdrew from the airport in 2002, with JAS resuming the route as a single daily MD-87 service in 2003. JAS also operated an Osaka (Kansai) service from 1995 to 2002, and a Fukuoka service from 2006 to 2008, while Nakanihon Airlines operated a summer seasonal Hakodate service from 1998 to 2001.

As of November 2023, the airport is served by JAL and FDA using an Embraer 170, Embraer 190 and Boeing 737 to Tokyo, Osaka, Sapporo and Nagoya.

During the aftermath of the 2011 Tohoku earthquake and tsunami, American troops used Yamagata Airport as a base for transporting fuel and materials to the disaster areas (part of Operation Tomodachi). According to the Ministry of Defense, this was the first time that the U.S. military had used a private airport in Japan for anything other than emergency landings.

== Terminal ==
The airport has a two-story terminal with two boarding gates and a rooftop observation deck.

== Airlines and destinations ==
Airlines	Destinations
Fuji Dream Airlines	Nagoya–Komaki, Sapporo–Chitose
J-Air	Osaka–Itami
Japan Airlines	Tokyo–Haneda

== Ground transportation ==
The airport has bus service to Yamagata Station.
