= Higashine =

Higashine 東根市
- City
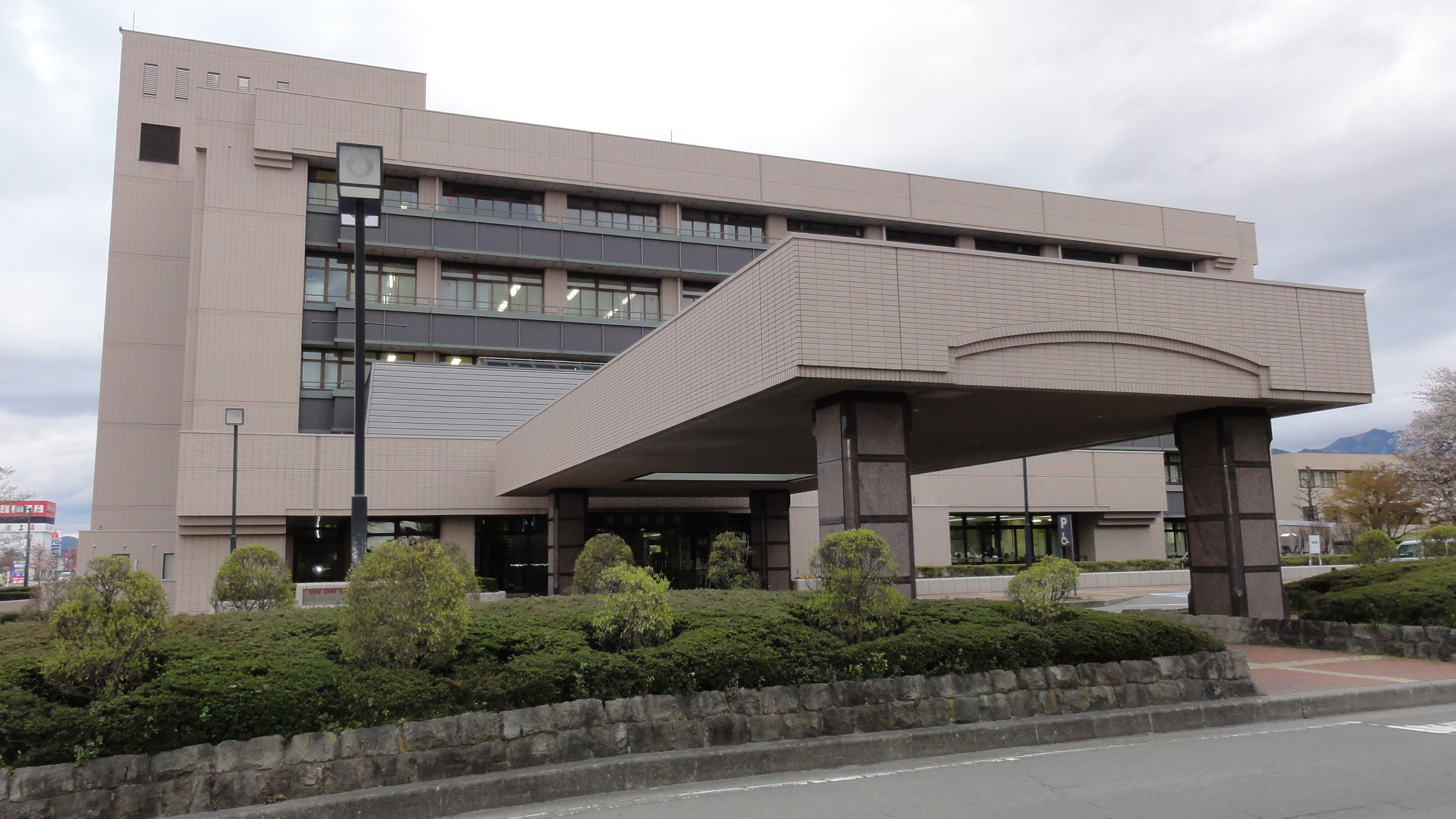
- Higashine City Hall

- Flag Seal

- Location of Higashine in Yamagata Prefecture

- Coordinates: 38°25′52.7″N 140°23′27.9″E
- Country: Japan
- Region: Tōhoku
- Prefecture: Yamagata

Area
  - Total: 207.17 km^{2} (79.99 sq mi)

Population (February 2020)
  - Total: 47,910
  - Density: 231.3/km^{2} (599.0/sq mi)
- Time zone: UTC+9 (Japan Standard Time)
- Phone number: 0237-42-1111
- Address: 1-1-1 Chūō, Higashine-shi, Yamagata-ken 999-3795
- Climate: Cfa/Dfa
- Website: Official website
- Symbols
- Flower: Cherry
- Tree: Japanese Zelkova

Higashine (東根市, Higashine-shi) is a city located in Yamagata Prefecture, Japan. As of 1 February 2020, the city had an estimated population of 47,910 in 17868 households, and a population density of 230 persons per km^{2}. The total area of the city is 207.17 square kilometres (80 sq mi).

== Geography ==
Located on the eastern shore of the Mogami River in the northern part of the Yamagata Basin, the urban area of Higashine is located in an alluvial fan created by the Shirasui River, the Murayamano River, and the Nitto River flowing from the Ōu Mountains in the eastern part of the city. The western portion of the city is hilly, rising to the Ōu Mountains which form its eastern border.

=== Neighboring municipalities ===
- Miyagi Prefecture
  - Sendai
- Yamagata Prefecture
  - Kahoku
  - Murayama
  - Obanazawa
  - Tendō
  - Yamagata

== Climate ==
Higashine has a humid continental climate (Köppen climate classification Cfa) with large seasonal temperature differences, with warm to hot (and often humid) summers and cold (sometimes severely cold) winters. Precipitation is significant throughout the year, but is heaviest from August to October. The average annual temperature in Higashine is 11.4 °C (52.5 °F). The average annual rainfall is 1,088.2 mm (42.84 in) with July as the wettest month. The temperatures are highest on average in August, at around 24.7 °C (76.5 °F), and lowest in January, at around −1.1 °C (30.0 °F).

Climate data for Higashine (elevation 105 m, 2003–2020 normals, extremes 2003–present)
| Month | Jan | Feb | Mar | Apr | May | Jun | Jul | Aug | Sep | Oct | Nov | Dec | Year |
|---|---|---|---|---|---|---|---|---|---|---|---|---|---|
| Record high °C (°F) | 12.4 (54.3) | 18.7 (65.7) | 22.3 (72.1) | 29.1 (84.4) | 33.5 (92.3) | 37.0 (98.6) | 37.8 (100.0) | 38.2 (100.8) | 36.7 (98.1) | 30.6 (87.1) | 23.7 (74.7) | 18.6 (65.5) | 38.2 (100.8) |
| Mean daily maximum °C (°F) | 2.3 (36.1) | 3.5 (38.3) | 8.3 (46.9) | 15.7 (60.3) | 22.3 (72.1) | 26.0 (78.8) | 28.4 (83.1) | 30.2 (86.4) | 26.0 (78.8) | 19.3 (66.7) | 12.3 (54.1) | 5.4 (41.7) | 16.7 (62.1) |
| Daily mean °C (°F) | −1.1 (30.0) | −0.5 (31.1) | 3.1 (37.6) | 9.0 (48.2) | 15.5 (59.9) | 20.0 (68.0) | 23.3 (73.9) | 24.7 (76.5) | 20.5 (68.9) | 13.4 (56.1) | 7.0 (44.6) | 1.6 (34.9) | 11.4 (52.5) |
| Mean daily minimum °C (°F) | −5.3 (22.5) | −5.0 (23.0) | −2.1 (28.2) | 2.5 (36.5) | 8.7 (47.7) | 14.4 (57.9) | 19.2 (66.6) | 20.2 (68.4) | 15.7 (60.3) | 7.9 (46.2) | 2.1 (35.8) | −2.3 (27.9) | 6.4 (43.5) |
| Record low °C (°F) | −15.0 (5.0) | −14.2 (6.4) | −10.7 (12.7) | −5.7 (21.7) | −0.2 (31.6) | 4.9 (40.8) | 10.1 (50.2) | 11.4 (52.5) | 4.9 (40.8) | −1.7 (28.9) | −5.8 (21.6) | −12.2 (10.0) | −15.0 (5.0) |
| Average precipitation mm (inches) | 90.4 (3.56) | 53.1 (2.09) | 61.6 (2.43) | 59.7 (2.35) | 63.4 (2.50) | 86.1 (3.39) | 162.3 (6.39) | 123.1 (4.85) | 100.3 (3.95) | 96.0 (3.78) | 80.8 (3.18) | 111.3 (4.38) | 1,088.2 (42.84) |
| Average precipitation days (≥ 1.0 mm) | 16.6 | 12.8 | 12.2 | 9.7 | 8.5 | 8.5 | 13.2 | 10.4 | 9.7 | 10.5 | 13.7 | 17.3 | 143.0 |
Source: Japan Meteorological Agency (2003–2020 normals, extremes 2003–present)

== Demographics ==
Per Japanese census data, the population of Higashine has grown steadily over the past 50 years.

Historical population
| Year | Pop. | ±% |
|---|---|---|
| 1920 | 25,059 | — |
| 1930 | 28,626 | +14.2% |
| 1940 | 30,257 | +5.7% |
| 1950 | 42,767 | +41.3% |
| 1960 | 40,917 | −4.3% |
| 1970 | 39,113 | −4.4% |
| 1980 | 40,559 | +3.7% |
| 1990 | 42,751 | +5.4% |
| 2000 | 44,800 | +4.8% |
| 2010 | 46,414 | +3.6% |
| 2020 | 47,682 | +2.7% |

== History ==
The area of present-day Higashine was part of ancient Dewa Province and is mentioned in the Engishiki records of the early Heian period. Under the Edo period Tokugawa shogunate, much of the area was part of the holdings of the Ezo-based Matsumae Domain. After the start of the Meiji period, the area became part of Kitamurayama District, Yamagata Prefecture. The village of Higashine was established on April 1, 1889 with the establishment of the modern municipalities system and was raised to town status on June 15, 1896. It attained city status on November 3, 1958.

== Government ==
Higashine has a mayor-council form of government with a directly elected mayor and a unicameral city legislature of 18 members. The city contributes two members to the Yamagata Prefectural Assembly. In terms of national politics, the city is part of Yamagata District 2 of the lower house of the Diet of Japan.

== Economy ==
Higashine is known as "The Fruit Kingdom" and is especially well known for its cherries as well as for apples, pears and persimmons. The city mascot is a pear with cherry earrings and a staff with an apple. Higashine is the largest producer of cherries in Yamagata Prefecture, which is the third largest producer of cherries in Japan.

Higashine also has a large industrial park. Some of the businesses include 3M, Casio, THK, ODELIC, and Kyocera. Many of these businesses are involved in manufacturing and research and development.

== Education ==
Higashine has nine public elementary schools and five public middle schools operated by the city government and one public high schools operated by the Yamagata Prefectural Board of Education. The prefecture also operates one special education school for the handicapped.

== Transportation ==
=== Airports ===
- Yamagata Airport

=== Railway ===
East Japan Railway Company - Yamagata Shinkansen

- Sakuranbo Higashine

East Japan Railway Company - Ōu Main Line

- Jinmachi - Sakuranbo Higashine - Higashine

=== Highway ===
- Tōhoku-Chūō Expressway – Higashine Interchange
- National Route 13
- National Route 48
- National Route 287

== Military ==
The 6th Division (第6師団) is one of nine active divisions of the Japan Ground Self-Defense Force is headquartered in at JGSDF Camp Jinmachi in Higashine. Its responsibility is the defense of Fukushima, Miyagi, and Yamagata prefectures.

== Noted people from Higashine ==
- Kazushige Abe, Akutagawa Prize winning novelist
- Masatoshi Abe, politician
- Tomoaki Honma, professional wrestler
