= Bilimora high-speed railway station =

Railway station in Gujarat, India

General information
- Location: Kesali, Bilimora, Gujarat, India
- Coordinates: 20.7807°N 73.0112°E
- Elevation: 34 metres (112 ft)
- Operator: National High Speed Rail Corporation Limited
- Line: Mumbai–Ahmedabad high-speed rail corridor
- Platforms: 2
- Tracks: 4

Construction
- Structure type: Elevated
- Parking: Yes

Other information
- Status: Under construction

History
- Opening: August 2027; 1 year's time
Route map
Key
- Source
Location
- Location within Gujarat Location within India
- Interactive map

Bilimora high-speed railway station is an under construction high-speed railway station on the Mumbai–Ahmedabad high-speed rail corridor. It is located at Kesali village near Bilimora, Gujarat, India. It is the sixth station of the Mumbai-Ahmedabad high-speed rail corridor, after Vapi station and before Surat station. It was initially scheduled to be completed by December 2024, and is slated to become operational by August 2027 along with the opening of the Surat-Vapi section of the high-speed rail corridor.

== Construction ==
The National High-Speed Rail Corporation Limited (NHSRCL) had invited tenders for Package "C4" of the Mumbai-Ahmedabad high-speed rail corridor (MAHSR) in September 2020, with a deadline of around 4 years. In October 2020, Larsen and Toubro won the tender. The NSHRCL signed an agreement with Larsen and Toubro for the design and construction of Vapi station and its depot, Bilimora station, Surat and its depot, Bharuch and Vadodara stations in November 2020. In July 2021, Larsen and Toubro began construction on the station after acquiring 11.4 hectares of land near Kesali. The station is slated to be completed by August 2026, the time also slated for opening of the Gujarat section of the high-speed rail corridor.

== Lines ==
The station will be served by the Mumbai–Ahmedabad high-speed rail corridor, and will be the sixth station of the Mumbai–Ahmedabad high-speed rail corridor in Bilimora.

== Structure ==
The station will have two platforms and two tracks for regular services. It will have three levels–the platform, concourse and service floor as the entrance level. The design of the station building will be inspired by the mango plantations because of its surrounding location covered by plantations. The station area will have 2 platforms of 425 m (1,394 ft) length for 16-coach E5 Series Shinkansen trains.

=== Station Layout (TBC) ===
G	Street Level	Exit/Entrance
L1	Mezzanine	Fare control, station agent, Automatic vending machines, crossover
P	FOB, Side platform | P1 Doors will open on the left
P	Platform 1	Towards → Sabarmati; Next Station: Surat
P	Express Lines	Towards → Sabarmati
P	Express Lines	Towards ← Mumbai BKC
P	Platform 2	Towards ← Mumbai BKC; Next Station: Vapi
P	FOB, Side platform | P2 Doors will open on the left
L2

== Features ==
Its design has been made to accommodate sufficient space for passenger movement and amenities at the concourse and platform areas. There will be ticketing and waiting areas, a business-class lounge, a nursery, restrooms, smoking rooms, information booths, retail centres and a public information and announcement system. Moreover, skylight provisions will be present on the roof and exterior sides for natural lighting and reduced energy usage. The station will be developed as a transport hub through integration with autos, buses and taxis. Such features will be available in all 12 stations of the Mumbai-Ahmedabad high-speed rail corridor.

== Connectivity ==
=== Road ===
The existing road linking Gandevi with the Bilimora-Chikhli Road or Gujarat SH-15 will be upgraded to link the station with the Golden Quadrilateral and the under-construction Delhi–Mumbai Expressway. Most of the stations being built in the Gujarat section of the Mumbai-Ahmedabad high-speed rail corridor are located near or next to state or national highways, in order to provide better and direct connectivity to the stations.

=== Rail ===
The nearest railway station after the station's completion will be Bilimora railway station, located 6 km (3.7 mi) south-west from the station.

== See also ==
- High-speed rail in India
- Mumbai-Ahmedabad high-speed rail corridor
- National High Speed Rail Corporation Limited
