= Dineshchandra R. Agrawal Infracon =

Indian construction company based in Gujarat

Dineshchandra R. Agrawal Infracon Private Limited (DRAIPL)
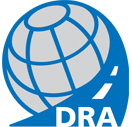
- Type: Private
- Industry: Engineering, Construction, Airports, Highways, Metro Rail and Railways
- Founded: 1972; 54 years ago
- Founder: Dineshchandra R. Agrawal
- Headquarters: Ambawadi, Ahmedabad, Gujarat, India
- Area served: India, Bangladesh, Mauritius and Nepal
- Key people: Dineshchandra R. Agrawal (Chairman & MD); Jagdishchandra Agrawal (Director); Bharatkumar O. Agrawal (Director); Hardik D. Agrawal (CEO & Director)
- Services: Engineering, Procurement and Construction (EPC)
- Revenue: ₹3,864 crores (2021-22)
- Net income: ₹231 crores (2021-22)
- Number of employees: 4,000 (March 2020)
- Website: www.draipl.com

Dineshchandra R. Agrawal Infracon Private Limited or DRA Infracon is an infrastructure development and construction company based at Ahmedabad in Gujarat, India. It was founded by Dineshchandra Rameshwarji Agrawal at Deesa in Banaskantha district of Gujarat in 1972. DRA Infracon got incorporated in the Ministry of Corporate Affairs on 7 November 2003.

The company operates in construction sector in Airports, Bridges, Highways, Expressways, Metro Rail, Railways, Smart Cities, and Water supply.

== Key projects ==
- Ahmedabad Metro (East-West Corridor)
- Chennai Metro (Purple Line)
- Jaipur Smart City (smart roads)
- Jogbani–Biratnagar Integrated Check Post
- Mumbai-Ahmedabad HSR (Bullet train)
- Prayagraj railway station redevelopment
- Rohini Heliport (Delhi)
- Sabarmati Riverfront (Ahmedabad)

=== Roads & Bridges ===
- Ahmedabad–Dholera Expressway (38 km only)
- Amritsar–Jamnagar Expressway (24 km only)
- Atal Setu, Sikkim (NH-10)
- DND–KMP Expressway (Delhi to Sohna)
- Delhi–Mumbai Expressway (84 km only)
- Raipur–Visakhapatnam Expressway (04 km in Odisha)
- Barmer–Jalore section of SH-16 in Rajasthan
- Indore–Dewas section of NH-3
- Lucknow outer ring road (Package-3A)
- Maitri Setu (India-Bangladesh)
- Mechi Bridge (India-Nepal)
- Meerut–Shamli–Karnal (NH-709A) (88 km)
- Munabao-Dhanana-Tanot (NH-70) (274 km)
- Raiganj–Dalkhola section of NH-12 (55 km)
- Salasar–Nagaur section of NH-58 (120 km)

=== Airports ===
- Gondia Airport (Maharashtra)
- Itanagar Airport (Arunachal Pradesh)
- Runway at Guwahati Airport
- Runway at Hindan Air Force Station
- Runway at INS Utkrosh (Port Blair)
- Runway at Leh Air Force Station (Ladakh)
- Runway at Nal Air Force Station (Bikaner)
- Runway at Palam Air Force Station
- Runway at Suratgarh Air Force Station
- Runway at Tezpur Air Force Station
- Runway at Vijayawada Airport

== Awards ==
- National Highways Excellence Awards (2021): Gold award in the category "Outstanding work in challenging conditions" by MoRTH in June 2022.
- National Highways Excellence Awards (2020): Gold award in Project Management (PPP) by MoRTH in January 2021.
- National Highways Excellence Awards (2020): Silver award in Project Management (EPC) by MoRTH in January 2021.
- 1st rank for India's fastest-growing construction company in the Medium category by Construction World in 2020.
- National Highways Excellence Awards (2019): Gold award in Project Management (PPP) by MoRTH in January 2020.
- 2nd rank for India's fastest-growing construction company in the Medium category by Construction World in 2019.

== See also ==
- Adani Group
- Dilip Buildcon
- Sadbhav Engineering
