= Vapi high-speed railway station =

Railway station in Gujarat, India

General information
- Location: Chanod Colony, Dungra, Vapi, Gujarat, India
- Coordinates: 20.3272°N 72.9491°E
- Elevation: 53 metres (174 ft)
- Operator: National High Speed Rail Corporation Limited
- Line: Mumbai–Ahmedabad high-speed rail corridor
- Platforms: 2
- Tracks: 2

Construction
- Structure type: Elevated
- Parking: Yes

Other information
- Status: Under construction

History
- Opening: August 2027; 1 year's time
Route map
Key
- Source
Location
- Location within Gujarat Location within India
- Interactive map

Vapi high-speed railway station is an under-construction high-speed railway station on the Mumbai–Ahmedabad high-speed rail corridor. This station is located near Chanod Colony, Dungra, Vapi, Gujarat, India. It is the fifth station of the Mumbai–Ahmedabad high-speed rail corridor, after Boisar station and before Bilimora station. The station will have the second depot of the high-speed rail corridor, just north of it near Karvad.

== Construction ==
The National High-Speed Rail Corporation Limited (NHSRCL) had invited tenders for Package "C4" of the Mumbai-Ahmedabad high-speed rail corridor (MAHSR) in September 2020, with a deadline of around 4 years. In October 2020, Larsen and Toubro won the tender. The NSHRCL signed an agreement with Larsen and Toubro for the design and construction of Vapi station and its depot, Bilimora station, Surat and its depot, Bharuch and Vadodara stations in November 2020. In August 2021, Larsen and Toubro began construction on both the station and its depot, after acquiring 11.7 hectares of land near Chanod Colony in Dungra, with a completion deadline of 48 months. This also marked the beginning of the large-scale construction of the high-speed rail corridor project. The station is slated to be completed by August 2026, the time also slated for opening of the Gujarat section of the high-speed rail corridor.

== Lines ==
The station will be served by the Mumbai–Ahmedabad high-speed rail corridor, and will be the fifth station of the Mumbai–Ahmedabad high-speed rail corridor in Vapi.

== Structure ==
The station will have two platforms and two tracks for regular services. It will have three levels–the platform, concourse and service floor as the entrance level. The exterior design of the station building will be inspired by the importance and significance of speed. The station area will have 2 platforms of 425 m (1,394 ft) length for 16-coach trains.

== Features ==
The station will have all modern and advanced facilities and amenities for customers and passengers, distinct from Indian Railway stations and similar to airports. Its design has been made to accommodate sufficient space for passenger movement and amenities at the concourse and platform areas. There will be ticketing and waiting areas, a business-class lounge, a nursery, restrooms, smoking rooms, information booths, retail centres and a public information and announcement system. Moreover, skylight provisions will be present on the roof and exterior sides for natural lighting and reduced energy usage. The station will be developed as a transport hub through integration with all basic modes of transportation for better, faster and hassle-free connectivity to and from the station, such as autos, buses and taxis. Such features will be available in all 12 stations of the Mumbai-Ahmedabad high-speed rail corridor.

== Vapi depot ==
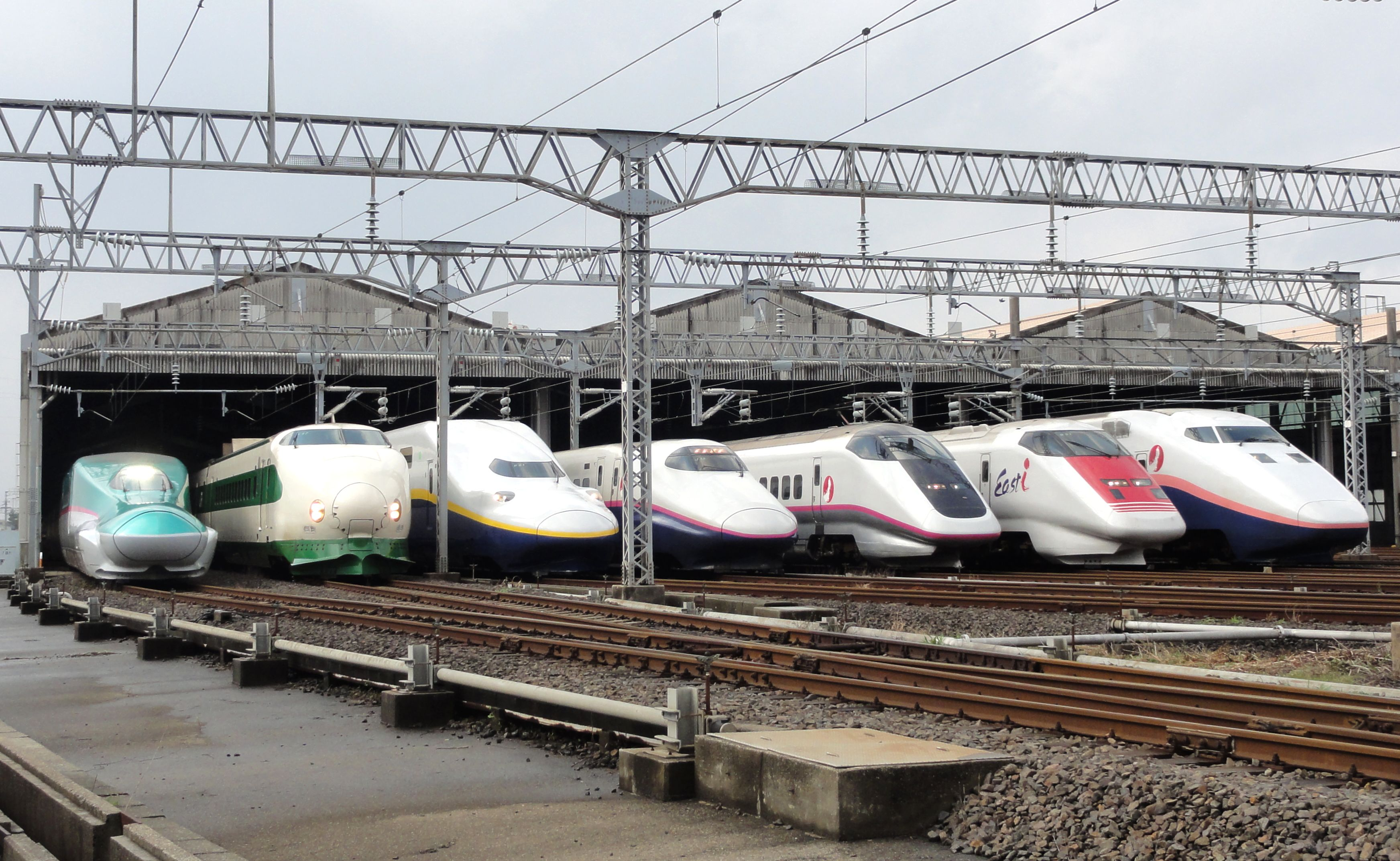
The depot is being constructed on the lines of Shinkansen train depots of Japan, such as the Niigata depot shown here.

The depot is one of the four planned depots of the Mumbai-Ahmedabad high-speed rail corridor, after Thane, Surat and Sabarmati depots, out of which the depot at Vapi being built near Karvad is the second. It will have all modern and advanced technologies like Shinkansen train depots in Japan, such as maintenance and cleaning of train sets, with inspection bays, washing plants, stabling lines, etc. Unlike Thane and Sabarmati depots, this depot is being constructed relatively smaller in size, because initially, after the opening of the Gujarat section of the Mumbai-Ahmedabad high-speed rail corridor, it will handle trainsets on a large scale for a short period of time, until when the Maharashtra section will be opened. After its opening, the entire high-speed rail corridor will be completed, thus this depot will be converted into a maintenance depot, like the depots at Virar and Bilimora. After conversion, it will have facilities for the stabling of the inspection and maintenance vehicles and material for the maintenance of the track, bridges and overhead equipments. Construction began on the depot in February 2022, after acquiring around 6 hectares of land near Karvad, being constructed by Ircon International. It is part of the high-speed rail corridor project's Package "T-2", which was awarded to Ircon International by the National High-Speed Rail Corporation Limited (NHSRCL) in the same month. The depot is also slated to be completed by the time of the station's completion.

== Connectivity ==
=== Road ===
The station is being built just next to the Vapi-Silvassa Road, or Gujarat SH-185, towards south. Because of this location, it will be accessible easily from Vapi, Dadra and Silvassa, as well as from the under-construction Delhi–Mumbai Expressway. Most of the stations being built in the Gujarat section of the Mumbai-Ahmedabad high-speed rail corridor are located near or next to state or national highways, in order to provide better and direct connectivity to the stations.

=== Rail ===
The nearest railway station after the station's completion will be Vapi railway station, located 7 km (4.3 mi) north-west from the station.

== See also ==
- High-speed rail in India
- Mumbai-Ahmedabad high-speed rail corridor
- National High Speed Rail Corporation Limited
