= Surat high-speed railway station =

Railway station in Gujarat, India

Surat

General information
- Location: Antroli, Surat GJ; India
- Coordinates: 21°10′49″N 72°55′50″E
- Elevation: 38 metres (125 ft)
- Operator: National High Speed Rail Corporation Limited
- Line: Mumbai–Ahmedabad high-speed rail corridor
- Platforms: 2
- Tracks: 4

Construction
- Structure type: Elevated
- Platform levels: 1
- Parking: Yes

Other information
- Status: Under construction

History
- Opening: August 2027; 11 months' time
Route map
Key
- Source
Location
- Location within Gujarat Location within India
- Interactive map

Surat high-speed railway station is an under construction high-speed railway station on the Mumbai–Ahmedabad high-speed rail corridor. It is located at Antroli near Surat and Kadodara in Gujarat, India. It is the seventh station of the Mumbai-Ahmedabad high-speed rail corridor, after Bilimora station and before Bharuch station. It was initially scheduled to be completed by December 2024, and is slated to become operational by August 2027 along with the opening of the Surat-Vapi section of the high-speed rail corridor. The station will have the third depot of the high-speed rail corridor, just south of it near Niyol railway station.

== Construction ==
The National High-Speed Rail Corporation Limited (NHSRCL) had invited tenders for Package "C4" of the Mumbai-Ahmedabad high-speed rail corridor (MAHSR) in September 2020, with a deadline of around 4 years. In October 2020, Larsen and Toubro won the tender. The NSHRCL signed an agreement with Larsen and Toubro for the design and construction of Vapi station and its depot, Bilimora station, Surat station and its depot, Bharuch and Vadodara stations in November 2020. In mid-2021, Larsen and Toubro began construction on the station after acquiring 12.1 hectares of land near Antroli. The station is slated to be completed by August 2026, the time also slated for opening of the Gujarat section of the high-speed rail corridor.

== Lines ==
The station will be served by the Mumbai–Ahmedabad high-speed rail corridor, and will be the seventh station of the Mumbai–Ahmedabad high-speed rail corridor in Surat.

== Structure ==
The station will have two platforms and two tracks for regular services. It will have three levels–the platform, concourse and service floor as the entrance level. The design of the station building will be inspired by the diamond because of Surat's nickname as the 'Diamond City of India' , where about 90% of the world's diamond supply are cut and polished in the city. The station area will have 2 platforms of 425 m (1,394 ft) length for 16-coach E5 Series Shinkansen trains.

=== Station Layout (TBC) ===
G	Street Level	Exit/Entrance
L1	Mezzanine	Fare control, station agent, Metro Card vending machines, crossover
L2	Platform 1	Towards → Sabarmati; Next Station: Bharuch
L2	Island platform | P1 Doors will open on the right | P2 Doors will open on the left
L2	Platform 2	Towards → Sabarmati; Next Station: Bharuch
L2	Platform 3	Towards ← Mumbai BKC; Next Station: Bilimora
L2	FOB, Island platform | P3 Doors will open on the left | P4 Doors will open on the right
L2	Platform 4	Towards ← Mumbai BKC; Next Station: Bilimora
L2

== Features ==
Its design has been made to accommodate sufficient space for passenger movement and amenities at the concourse and platform areas. There will be ticketing and waiting areas, a business-class lounge, a nursery, restrooms, smoking rooms, information booths, retail centres and a public information and announcement system. Moreover, skylight provisions will be present on the roof and exterior sides for natural lighting and reduced energy usage. The station will be developed as a transport hub through integration with autos, buses and taxis. Such features will be available in all 12 stations of the Mumbai-Ahmedabad high-speed rail corridor.

== Surat depot ==
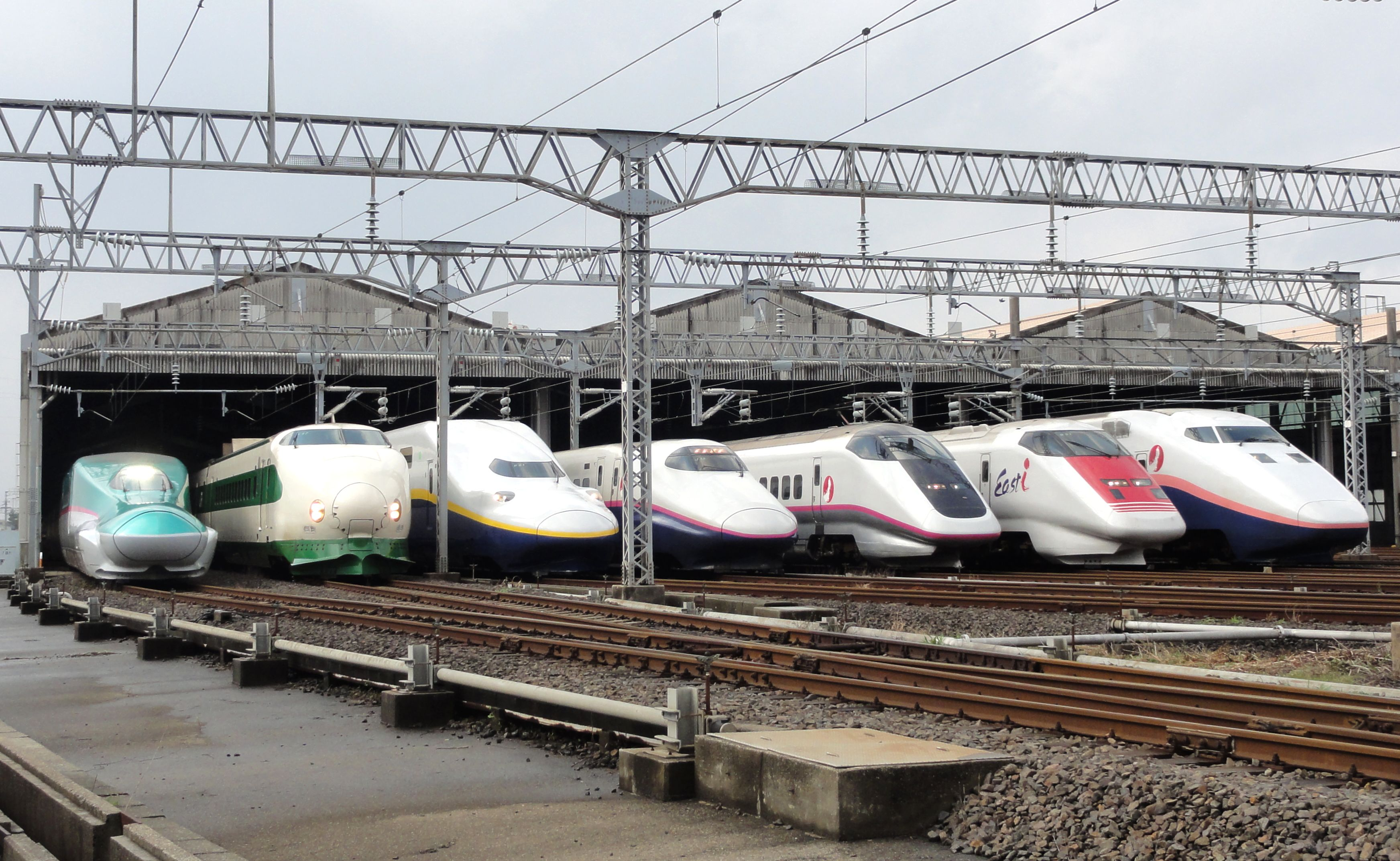
The depot is being constructed on the lines of Shinkansen train depots of Japan, such as the Niigata depot shown here.

The depot is one of the four planned depots of the Mumbai-Ahmedabad high-speed rail corridor, after Vapi, Thane and Sabarmati depots, out of which the depot at Surat being built just on the north side of Niyol railway station is the third. It will have all modern and advanced technologies like Shinkansen train depots in Japan, such as maintenance and cleaning of train sets, with inspection bays, washing plants, stabling lines, etc. Unlike Thane and Sabarmati depots, this depot is being constructed relatively smaller in size, because initially, after the opening of the Gujarat section of the Mumbai-Ahmedabad high-speed rail corridor, it will handle trainsets on a large scale for a short period of time, until when the Maharashtra section will be opened. After its opening, the entire high-speed rail corridor will be completed, thus this depot will be converted into a maintenance depot, like the depots at Virar and Bilimora. After conversion, it will have facilities for the stabling of the inspection and maintenance vehicles and material for the maintenance of the track, bridges and overhead equipments. Construction began on the depot in February 2022, after acquiring around 38 hectares of land near Niyol railway station, being constructed by Ircon International. It is part of the high-speed rail corridor project's Package "T-2", which was awarded to Ircon International by the National High-Speed Rail Corporation Limited (NHSRCL) in the same month. The depot is also slated to be completed by the time of the station's completion.

== Connectivity ==
=== Road ===
The station is located just next to the Surat-Bardoli Road towards south. An approach road towards the station's entrance will be built to connect it with the road, from there to the Golden Quadrilateral and the under-construction Delhi–Mumbai Expressway. Most of the stations being built in the Gujarat section of the Mumbai-Ahmedabad high-speed rail corridor are located near or next to state or national highways, in order to provide better and direct connectivity to the stations.

=== Rail ===
The nearest railway station after the station's completion will be Niyol railway station, located around 5 km (3.1 mi) south-west from the station, while the nearest major railway stations will be Surat and Udhna stations, both located around 12 km (7.5 mi) north-west and south-west from the station.

=== Air ===
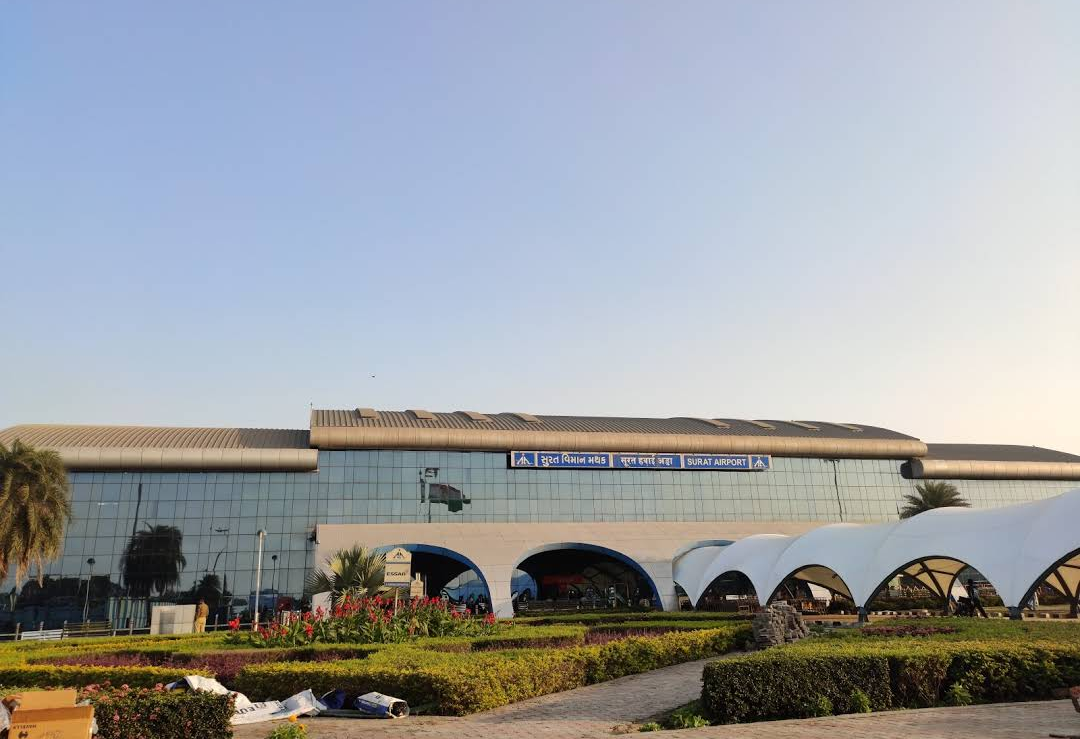
Surat International Airport

The nearest airport after the station's completion will be Surat International Airport, located around 25 km (16 mi) south-west from the station.

== See also ==
- High-speed rail in India
- Mumbai-Ahmedabad high-speed rail corridor
- National High Speed Rail Corporation Limited
