= Vadodara high-speed railway station =

Railway station in Gujarat, India

Vadodara

General information
- Location: Pratapgunj, Vadodara, Gujarat, India
- Coordinates: 22.3153°N 73.1798°E
- Elevation: 56 metres (184 ft)
- Operator: National High Speed Rail Corporation Limited
- Line: Mumbai–Ahmedabad high-speed rail corridor
- Platforms: 2
- Tracks: 2

Construction
- Structure type: Elevated
- Parking: Yes

Other information
- Status: Under construction

History
- Opening: 2029
Route map
Key
- Source
Location
- Location within Gujarat Location within India
- Interactive map

Vadodara high-speed railway station is an under construction high-speed railway station on the Mumbai–Ahmedabad high-speed rail corridor. This station is located near Vadodara Junction railway station in Pratapgunj, Vadodara, Gujarat, India. It is the ninth station of the Mumbai–Ahmedabad high-speed rail corridor, after Bharuch station and before Anand-Nadiad station.

== Construction ==
The National High-Speed Rail Corporation Limited (NHSRCL) had invited tenders for Package "C5" of the Mumbai-Ahmedabad high-speed rail corridor (MAHSR) in June 2021, with a deadline of around 4 years. In December 2021, Larsen and Toubro won the tender. The NSHRCL signed an agreement with Larsen and Toubro for the design and construction of Vapi station and its depot, Bilimora station, Surat station and its depot, Bharuch and Vadodara stations in January 2022, as part of the "C4" package in November 2020, and separately as the "C5" package in January 2022. In mid-2021, Larsen and Toubro began construction on the station, after acquiring around 2 hectares of land near platform no.7 of Vadodara Junction railway station, with a deadline of 49 months. The station is slated to be completed by August 2026, the time also slated for opening of the Gujarat section of the high-speed rail corridor.

== Lines ==
The station will be served by the Mumbai–Ahmedabad high-speed rail corridor, and will be the ninth station of the Mumbai–Ahmedabad high-speed rail corridor in Vadodara.

== Structure ==
The station will have two platforms and two tracks for regular services. It will have three levels–the platform, concourse and service floor as the entrance level. The design of the station will be inspired by the 'Vad' , or the Banyan tree, after which Vadodara is named; owing to its notable presence on the city's environment. The station area will have 2 platforms of 425 m (1,394 ft) length for 16-coach E5 Series Shinkansen trains.

== Features ==
The station will have all modern and advanced facilities and amenities for customers and passengers, distinct from Indian Railway stations and similar to airports. Its design has been made to accommodate sufficient space for passenger movement and amenities at the concourse and platform areas. There will be ticketing and waiting areas, a business-class lounge, a nursery, restrooms, smoking rooms, information booths, retail centres and a public information and announcement system. Moreover, skylight provisions will be present on the roof and exterior sides for natural lighting and reduced energy usage. The station will be developed as a transport hub through integration with all basic modes of transportation for better, faster and hassle-free connectivity to and from the station, such as autos, buses and taxis. Such features will be available in all 12 stations of the Mumbai-Ahmedabad high-speed rail corridor.

== Connectivity ==
=== Road ===
The station is being built just next to Vadodara Junction railway station, towards north. Because of this location, it will be accessible easily from the entire city through the railway station, as it will connect this station from platform no.7 through skywalks and multiple entry/exit points in different platforms of the railway station. It will be also accessible through the existing station road connecting with the city's major roads. Most of the stations being built in the Gujarat section of the Mumbai–Ahmedabad high-speed rail corridor are located near or next to state or national highways, in order to provide better and direct connectivity to the stations.

=== Rail ===
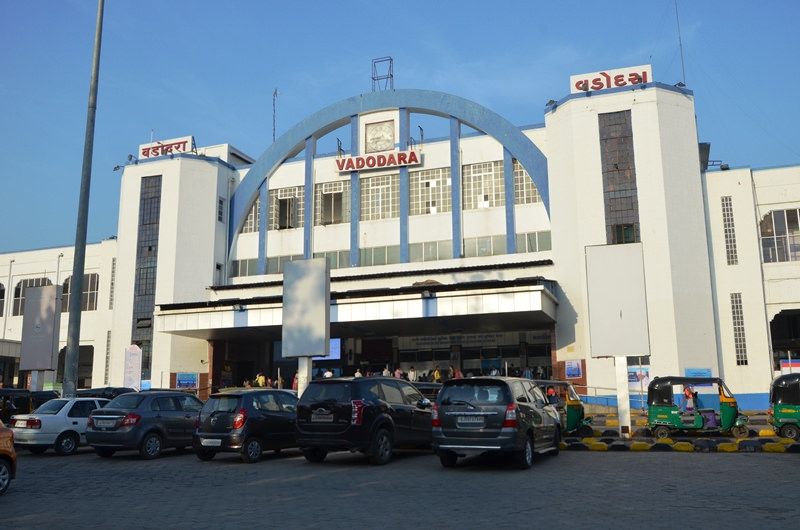
Vadodara Junction railway station

The nearest railway station after the station's completion will be Vadodara Junction railway station, located just a few hundred metres south from the station.

=== Air ===
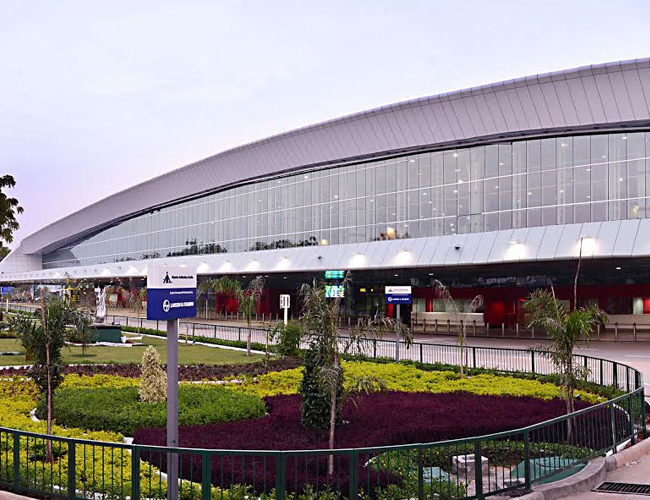
Vadodara Airport

The nearest airport after the station's completion will be Vadodara Airport, located around 6 km (3.7 mi) north-east from the station.

== See also ==
- High-speed rail in India
- Banyan
- Mumbai-Ahmedabad high-speed rail corridor
- National High Speed Rail Corporation Limited
