= Baruch station =

Baruch station or Bharuch station may refer to:

- Migdal HaEmek–Kfar Baruch railway station, in Israel
- Bharuch high-speed railway station, in India
