= Sabarmati high-speed railway station =

High-speed railway station in Gujarat, India

General information
- Location: Ram Nagar, Sabarmati, Ahmedabad, Gujarat, India
- Coordinates: 23.0756°N 72.5879°E
- Elevation: 76 metres (249 ft)
- Operator: National High Speed Rail Corporation Limited
- Line: Mumbai–Ahmedabad HSR
- Platforms: 2
- Tracks: 2
- Connections: Sabarmati Junction; Red Line AEC

Construction
- Structure type: Elevated
- Parking: Yes

Other information
- Status: Under construction

History
- Opening: 2029
Route map
Key
- Source
Location
- Location within Gujarat Location within India
- Interactive map

Sabarmati high-speed railway station is an under construction high-speed railway station on the Mumbai–Ahmedabad high-speed rail corridor. This station is located near Sabarmati Junction railway station in Ram Nagar, Sabarmati, Ahmedabad, Gujarat. It is the twelfth and the last station, as well as the northern terminus of the Mumbai–Ahmedabad high-speed rail corridor.

== Construction ==
The National High-Speed Rail Corporation Limited (NHSRCL) had invited tenders for Package "C8" of the Mumbai-Ahmedabad high-speed rail corridor (MAHSR) in October 2020, with a deadline of around 4 years. In April 2021, SCC–VRS (JV) won the tender. The NSHRCL signed a letter of agreement (LoA) with the JV for the design and construction of Sabarmati station and its depot in February 2022. The JV will design and construct the station and approach tracks to the depot, while the design and construction of the depot was awarded to L&T–Sojitz (JV), as part of the project's Package "D2", whose tenders were invited by NHSRCL in July 2021. The design and construction of the station's integrated multimodal passenger and transport complex was awarded to B. L. Kashyap & Sons Limited in November 2019, as part of the very first tender of the railway project, which was invited by NHSRCL in October 2019. In January 2020, B. L. Kashyap & Sons Limited began construction on the station's multi-modal passenger transit complex, after acquiring around 3.5 hectares of land near Sabarmati Junction railway station, with a deadline of 48 months, while construction on the station and its depot was started in the first quarter of 2022, after acquiring around 3 hectares of land in between Sabarmati main and BG railway stations and 82 hectares of land near the existing New Delhi–Mumbai main line in Kali, Sabarmati, both with a deadline of around 3.5 years, respectively. The integrated multi-modal passenger transit complex was expected to be completed by December 2023, which was done on time, and was officially declared finished by the Minister of Railways, Ashwini Vaishnaw, in December 2023. The station and its depot are slated to be completed by August 2026, the time also slated for opening of the Gujarat section of the high-speed rail corridor.

== Lines ==
The station will be served by the Mumbai–Ahmedabad high-speed rail corridor, and will be the twelfth and the last station of the Mumbai–Ahmedabad high-speed rail corridor in Sabarmati. It is also planned to have the branch line towards New Delhi to the north as part of the Delhi–Ahmedabad high-speed rail corridor, to form a continuous high-speed railway line from Mumbai to New Delhi.

== Structure ==
The station will have two platforms and two tracks for regular services, which will have a provision of extending to four for each in the future. It will have three levels–the platform, concourse and service floor as the entrance level. The design of the station will be inspired by the Sabarmati River, which will be symbolised by the blue shade as glass and artworks, because of its significance of flowing near Sabarmati and through Ahmedabad, and the Charkha used by Mahatma Gandhi in his ashram at Sabarmati. It will have white needles in the central exterior façade, which will give a bright appearance of the symbol of the spokes of the Chakra, not only during the day, but also at night. The station area will have 2 platforms of 425 m (1,394 ft) length for 16-coach E5 Series Shinkansen trains.

== Features ==
The station will have all modern and advanced facilities and amenities for customers and passengers, distinct from Indian Railway stations and similar to airports. Its design has been made to accommodate sufficient space for passenger movement and amenities at the concourse and platform areas. There will be ticketing and waiting areas, a business-class lounge, a nursery, restrooms, smoking rooms, information booths, retail centres and a public information and announcement system. Moreover, skylight provisions will be present on the roof and exterior sides for natural lighting and reduced energy usage. The station will be connected through elevated walkways to the integrated multi-modal passenger transit complex, developed as a transport hub, from which all basic modes of transportation will be available for better, faster and hassle-free connectivity to and from the station, such as autos, metro, buses and taxis. Such features will be available in all 12 stations of the Mumbai-Ahmedabad high-speed rail corridor.

== Sabarmati depot ==
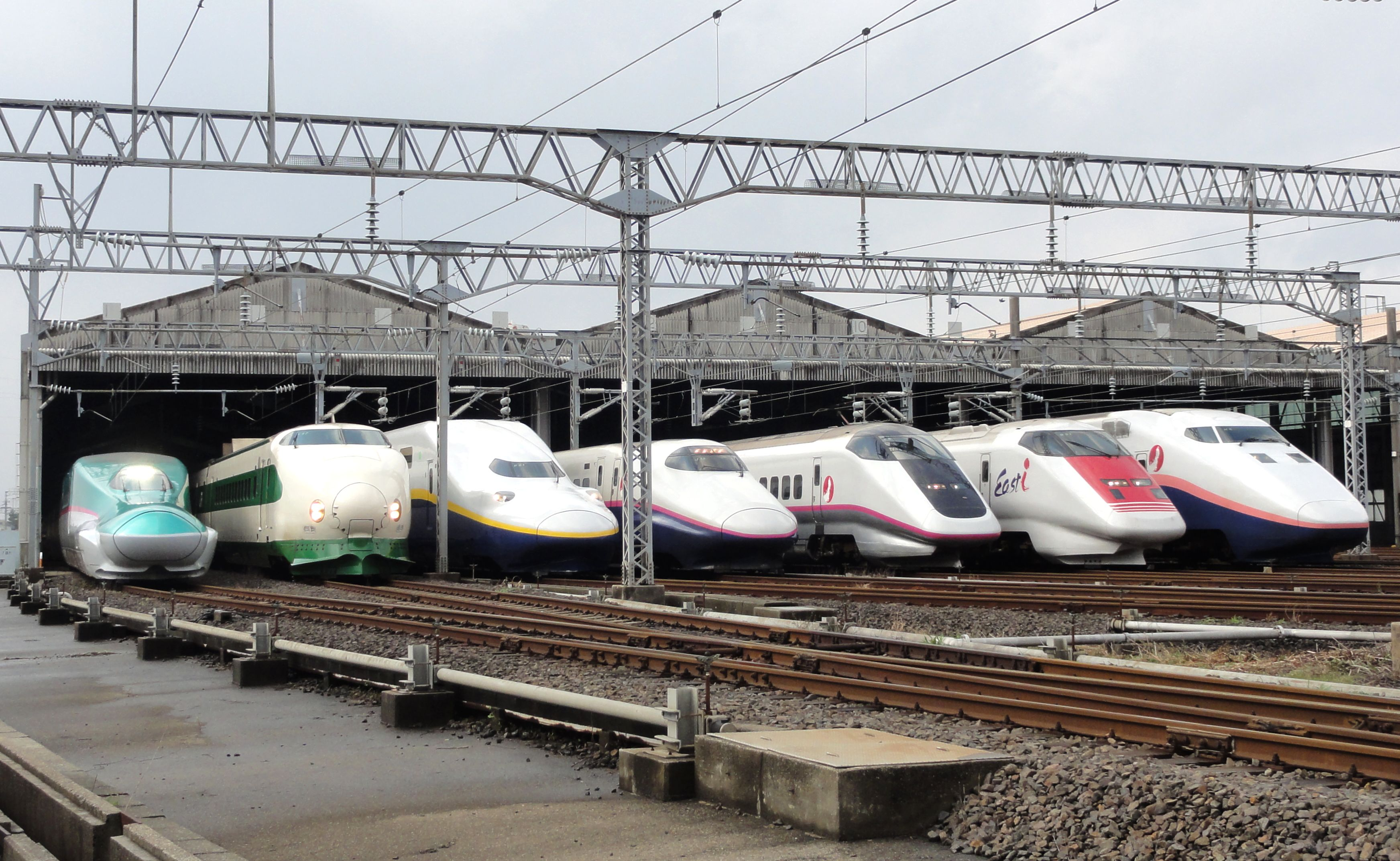
The depot is being constructed on the lines of Shinkansen train depots of Japan, such as the Niigata depot shown here.

The depot is one of the four planned depots of the Mumbai-Ahmedabad high-speed rail corridor, after Thane, Vapi and Surat depots, out of which the depot at Sabarmati to be built in Kali is the last. It will be the biggest railway depot in India, and will have an Operations Control Centre (OCC), a workshop, inspection shed's, maintenance facilities among other service facilities. It will have all modern and advanced facilities like the Shinkansen, such as maintenance and cleaning of train sets, with inspection bays, washing plants, stabling lines, etc. It will have at least 10 inspection lines and around 40 stabling lines.

Around 250 types of more than 800 numbers of specialised machinery required to inspect and maintain the rolling stock will be procured from Japan for this depot, including checking for vibrations, temperature, and noise, which are critical for high-speed running and will ensure passenger comfort. The depot will be equipped with various modern systems like building management systems, IT and data network systems, fire detection and alarm system, access control system, etc.

=== Features ===
The depot will have the following features, similar to the Sendai and Kanazawa Shinkansen train depots of Japan:

- The depot will have all safety features to ensure safe and reliable maintenance of the trainsets.
- Sewage and effluent generated from trainsets and within the depot will be treated and recycled in modern sewage and effluent treatment plants.
- The machinery to be used in the depot will consist of bogie exchange machine, underfloor wheel re-profiling machines, testers and data readers, ultrasonic flaw detectors, trainset washing plants, among many other systems, will be used for the maintenance of trainsets as per Shinkansen standards at the depot.
- To provide a safe and healthy work environment, the depot will have the latest architectural features like proper ventilation, noise and dust suppression, water conservation measures like rainwater harvesting and water recycling and natural lighting, in addition to LED-based lighting systems and provision to installation of solar panels on the roof of the sheds and buildings in the future.
- It will be an eco-friendly and green facility, in order to promote using clean energy and adopting sustainability.

The depot will cover an area of 57 hectares of land near the existing New Delhi-Mumbai main line in Kali. As the tender of the Package "C8" of the Mumbai-Ahmedabad high-speed rail corridor has been awarded to Shashin Construction Company (SCC)–Velji Ratna Sorathia Infra Private Limited (VRSIPL) (JV), it will construct the tracks that will approach the depot from the southern side, and the depot will be designed and constructed by Larsen & Toubro (L&T)–Sojitz Corporation (JV), as part of Package "D2" of the project. It will be completed in a deadline of around 5.5 years. Construction on the depot began in mid-2022, and is slated to be completed by the time of the station's completion.

== Integrated multi-modal passenger and transport terminal ==
As the last and the northern terminus of the Mumbai–Ahmedabad high-speed rail corridor, the station has an integrated multi-modal passenger and transport terminal building situated within its premises, located less than 400 m away from the station's site. It has been built to facilitate easy, fast and safe transit of passengers to and from the station and the city. Construction on the terminal began in January 2020, and was completed in December 2023. It covers an area of 3.51 ha (8.7 acres) and has nine floors, mainly dedicated to host retail stores, offices, commercial spaces and small-scale businesses to offer necessary services to passengers. For faster connectivity, there are three elevated walkways–the first one connects both the station and the terminal by passing over the Indian railway tracks, the second one connects the terminal with the nearby AEC metro station of Ahmedabad Metro's Line 2 (Red Line) and the third one leading to the west will connect both the station and the passenger terminal with the western part of Sabarmati. The terminal complex is integrated with all basic modes of transportation, like the Ahmedabad Bus Rapid Transit System (BRTS), Ahmedabad Metro, cabs and autos. It is connected with Sabarmati Junction railway station through an approach road and the existing road leading towards the station.

The complex has two buildings, both identical in structure and varying only in size, separated by a green space and access roads in between and connected by a large central corridor, which acts as a central hub concourse that consists of pick-up and drop-off areas for passenger transit through public transport like buses and cars, and the approach roads that pass through the complex connecting two roads–the Ahmedabad–Patan Highway and the Sabarmati Junction station road. It features a dedicated concourse floor at the third floor for passengers, offering amenities such as waiting areas, retail spaces, and restaurants. It has dedicated parking spaces for private cars, cabs, buses, autos, and two-wheelers within the terminal's premises. Above the concourse floor, the building blocks are divided into two separate segments, Block A and Block B, with interconnecting terraces at two levels. Block A, with six floors above the concourse, is reserved for future office space, while Block B, with four floors, is designed to house a hotel facility with rooms, banquet halls, conference rooms, a swimming pool, and a restaurant. For seamless passenger interchange between Indian Railways and the high-speed railway, a ticket counter facility for Indian Railways has also been provided in the central hub. The terminal complex has been designed to match with historical context of Sabarmati. A large stainless steel mural depicting the famous Salt March, in which the movement's leader, Mahatma Gandhi, and his followers have been shown, crafted on the south-facing façade of the building.

Embracing sustainable practices, the complex incorporates various green building features, including the installation of solar panels on terraces, which will generate about 1 million units of green electricity annually, extensive landscape terraces and gardens for enhanced design and green space on the south-east side, efficient water management techniques like rainwater harvesting, sustainable energy consumption and waste disposal systems, energy-efficient air conditioning, and LED-based lighting fixtures. The design ensures ample natural light to penetrate inside and scenic views in most occupied areas throughout the entire building.

== Connectivity ==
=== Road ===
The station is being built just next to Sabarmati Junction railway station, towards south. Because of this location, it will be accessible easily from the entire city not only through the railway station, but also from the Ahmedabad–Patan Highway, passing parallelly southwards, through skywalks and access roads from the hub concourse area of the terminal complex. It will be also accessible through the existing station road connecting with the city's major roads. Most of the stations being built in the Gujarat section of the Mumbai–Ahmedabad high-speed rail corridor are located near or next to state or national highways, in order to provide better and direct connectivity to the stations.

=== Rail ===
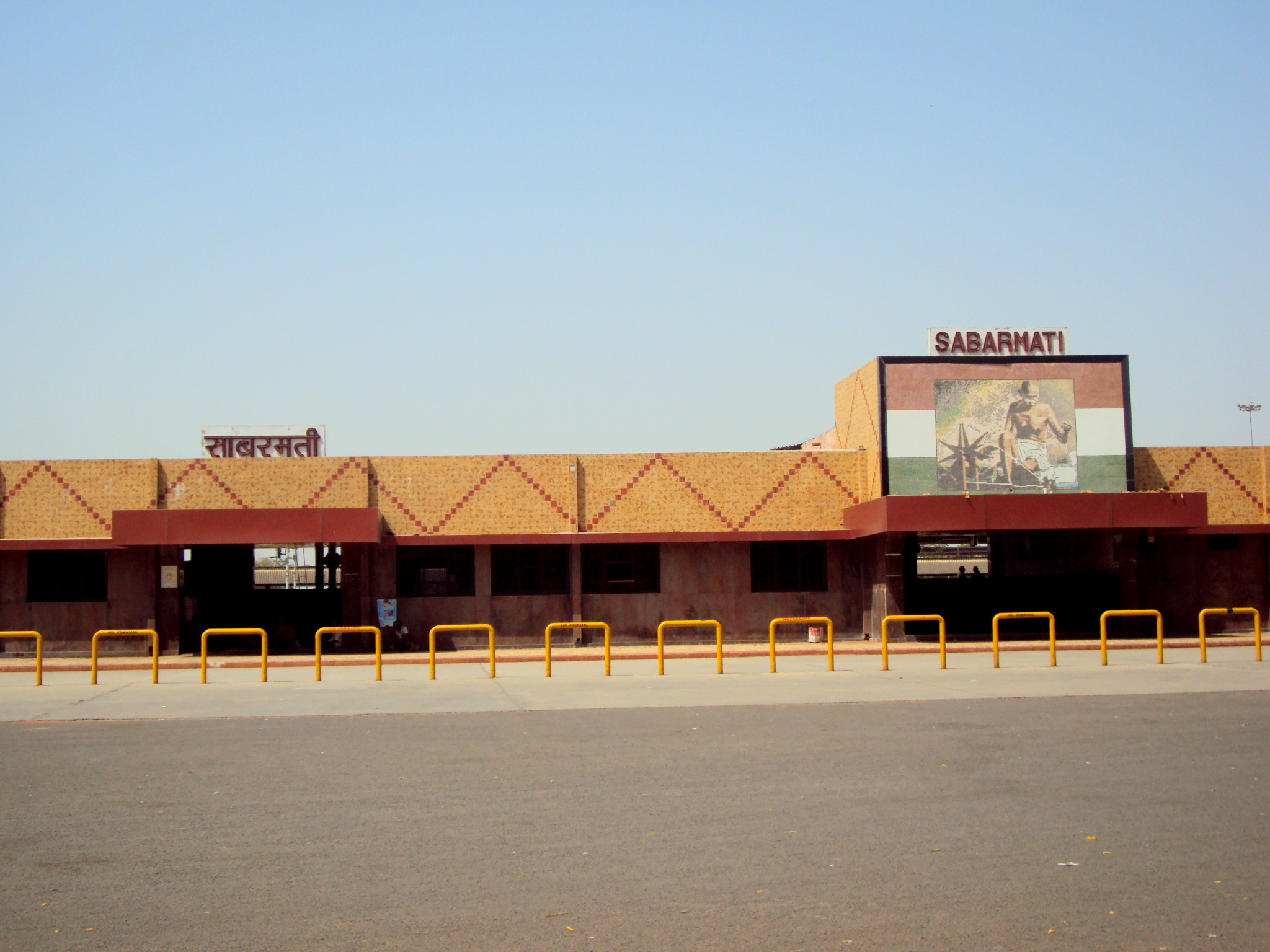
Sabarmati Junction railway station

The nearest railway station after the station's completion will be Sabarmati Junction railway station, located just a few hundred metres north from the station.

=== Bus ===
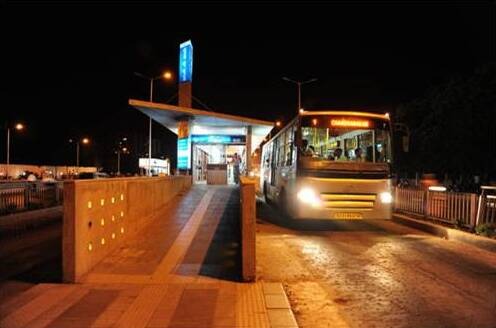
A bus parked at a BRTS station operating under the Ahmedabad Bus Rapid Transit System

The nearest bus station will be Sabarmati Power House BRTS station on the Ahmedabad Bus Rapid Transit System, located just a kilometre away towards east from the station. It will be connected directly to the high-speed railway station through one of the three elevated walkways originating from the hub concourse level the terminal complex.

=== Metro ===
The nearest metro station will be AEC metro station of Ahmedabad Metro's Line 2 (Red Line), located at the same distance like the Sabarmati Power House bus station, because the bus station lies directly under the metro station. It will also be connected directly to the high-speed railway station through the elevated walkway originating from the terminal complex.

=== Air ===
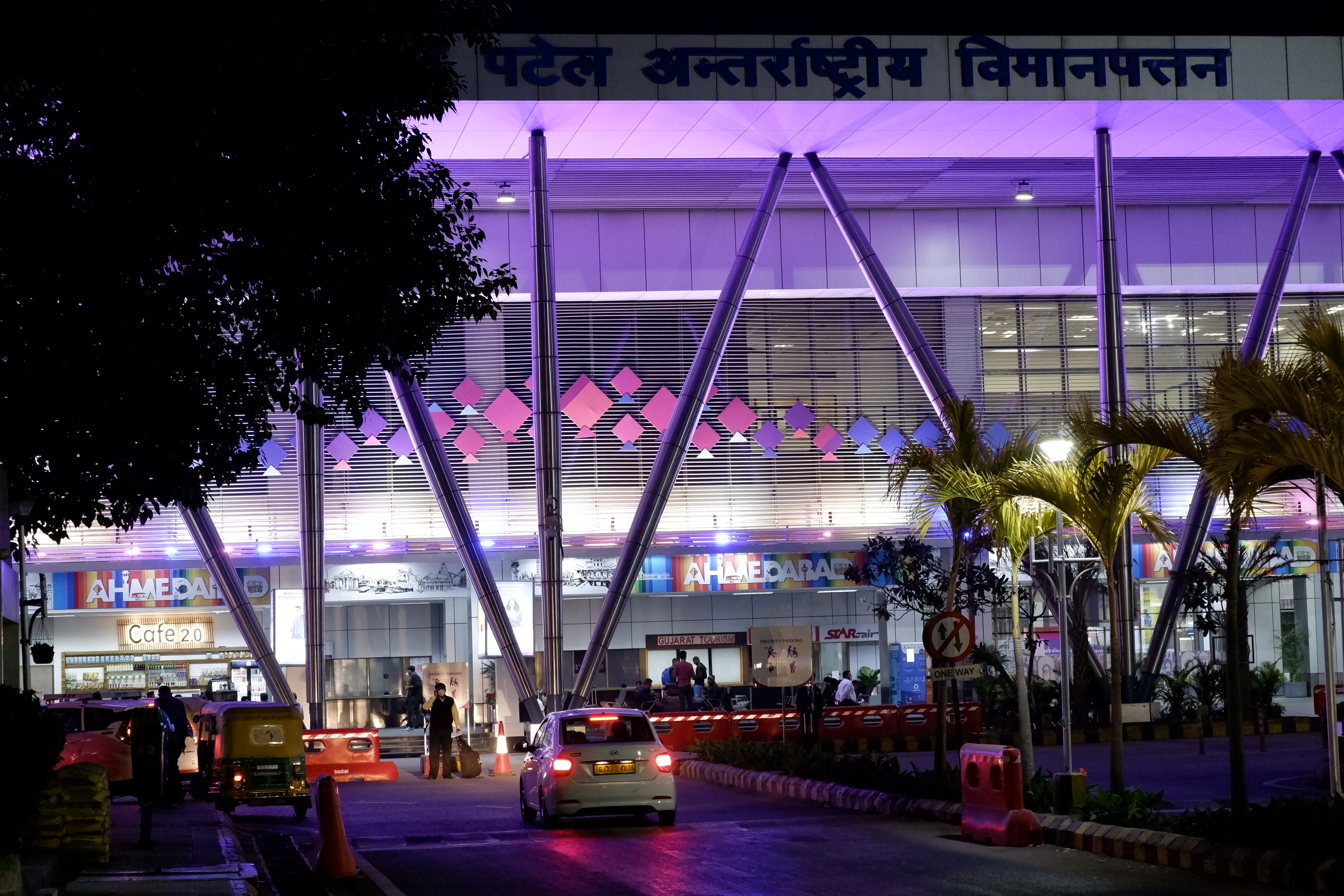
Sardar Vallabhbhai Patel International Airport

The nearest airport after the station's completion will be Sardar Vallabhbhai Patel International Airport, located around 9 km (5.6 mi) east from the station.

== Future plans ==
The station will be expanded to handle more passenger capacity and trains by integrating it with the Delhi–Ahmedabad high-speed rail corridor, as an extension of the Mumbai–Ahmedabad high-speed rail corridor, from where the conversion of two tracks into four tracks will get branched–one towards its depot and another towards New Delhi. The Sabarmati depot will also be expanded and optimised to cater more trains and provide services. The Delhi–Ahmedabad high-speed rail corridor is slated to be completed by the late 2030s.

== See also ==
- High-speed rail in India
- Charkha
- Mahatma Gandhi
- Salt March
- Mumbai–Ahmedabad high-speed rail corridor
- Delhi–Ahmedabad high-speed rail corridor
- National High Speed Rail Corporation Limited
