= Bharuch high-speed railway station =

Railway station in Gujarat, India

General information
- Location: Kunkarwada, Bharuch, Gujarat, India
- Coordinates: 21.6973°N 72.9517°E
- Elevation: 35 metres (115 ft)
- Operator: National High Speed Rail Corporation Limited
- Line: Mumbai–Ahmedabad high-speed rail corridor
- Platforms: 2
- Tracks: 2

Construction
- Structure type: Elevated
- Parking: Yes

Other information
- Status: Under construction

History
- Opening: 2029
Route map
Key
- Source
Location
- Location within Gujarat Location within India
- Interactive map

Bharuch high-speed railway station is an under construction high-speed railway station on the Mumbai–Ahmedabad high-speed rail corridor. This station is located near Kunkarwada, Bharuch, Gujarat, India. It is the eighth station of the Mumbai–Ahmedabad high-speed rail corridor, after Surat station and before Vadodara station.

== Construction ==
The National High-Speed Rail Corporation Limited (NHSRCL) had invited tenders for Package "C4" of the Mumbai-Ahmedabad high-speed rail corridor (MAHSR) in September 2020, with a deadline of around 4 years. In October 2020, Larsen and Toubro won the tender. The NSHRCL signed an agreement with Larsen and Toubro for the design and construction of Vapi station and its depot, Bilimora station, Surat station and its depot, Bharuch and Vadodara stations in November 2020. In August 2021, Larsen and Toubro began construction on the station, after acquiring 12.9 hectares of land near Kunkarwada. The station is slated to be completed by August 2026, the time also slated for opening of the Gujarat section of the high-speed rail corridor.

== Lines ==
The station will be served by the Mumbai–Ahmedabad high-speed rail corridor, and will be the eighth station of the Mumbai–Ahmedabad high-speed rail corridor in Bharuch.

== Structure ==
The station will have two platforms and two tracks for regular services. It will have three levels–the platform, concourse and service floor as the entrance level. The design of the station will be inspired by Bharuch's famous cotton weaving industry and the Bandhani technique, honouring 150 years of the industry and its artists. The station area will have 2 platforms of 425 m (1,394 ft) length for 16-coach E5 Series Shinkansen trains.

== Features ==
The station will have all modern and advanced facilities and amenities for customers and passengers, distinct from Indian Railway stations and similar to airports. Its design has been made to accommodate sufficient space for passenger movement and amenities at the concourse and platform areas. There will be ticketing and waiting areas, a business-class lounge, a nursery, restrooms, smoking rooms, information booths, retail centres and a public information and announcement system. Moreover, skylight provisions will be present on the roof and exterior sides for natural lighting and reduced energy usage. The station will be developed as a transport hub through integration with all basic modes of transportation for better, faster and hassle-free connectivity to and from the station, such as autos, buses and taxis. Such features will be available in all 12 stations of the Mumbai-Ahmedabad high-speed rail corridor.

== Land acquisition issues ==
When the National High Speed Rail Corporation Limited (NHSRCL) began land acquisition for the station and the high-speed railway viaduct, they were met with protests from farmers in the region because of not only losing their land but also the fear of not getting sufficient compensation from NHSRCL, thus fearing them of losing their livelihoods as a whole. They demanded various topics to be discussed so that they could sustain their lives while carrying out their occupations under the Right to Fair Compensation and Transparency in Land Acquisition, Rehabilitation and Resettlement Act, 2013 and to the Annual Statement of Rate (ASR) for compensation. The NHSRCL officials advised the land acquisition officer of Bharuch district to prepare a report on these topics and send it to the district revenue department for review to issue a final notice for the land acquisition to be undertaken. The main reasons for which the farmers objected were the implementation of all acquisition procedures based on the Right to Fair Compensation and Transparency in Land Acquisition, Rehabilitation and Resettlement Act, 2013, and to carry out social and environmental impact assessments under the Land Acquisition Act, 2013. Any debate regarding how the project would affect the farmers, their farmlands and how it would benefit the farmers during and after the project's execution was undone. The farmers concluded that their opposition would continue until their requests were resolved. Finally, NHSRCL, Indian Railways, the central and state governments reached a consensus on paying all farmers in the entire Gujarat section of the Mumbai-Ahmedabad high-speed rail corridor not only a fair but a double compensation for their livelihoods to be sustained, and hence, the problem got resolved on time and did not lead to delay in land acquisition and execution of the project.

== Connectivity ==
=== Road ===
The station is being built just next to the Bharuch-Dahej Road, or Gujarat SH-6, towards north. Because of this location, it will be accessible easily from Bharuch and Ankleshwar, as well as from the under-construction Delhi–Mumbai Expressway. Most of the stations being built in the Gujarat section of the Mumbai-Ahmedabad high-speed rail corridor are located near or next to state or national highways, in order to provide better and direct connectivity to the stations.

=== Rail ===
The nearest railway station after the station's completion will be Bharuch Junction railway station, located around 8 km (5.0 mi) east from the station.

== See also ==
- High-speed rail in India
- Bandhani
- Mumbai-Ahmedabad high-speed rail corridor
- National High Speed Rail Corporation Limited
