= Ahmedabad–Dholera high-speed rail corridor =

Indian high speed rail line

Ahmedabad-Dholera High-Speed Rail Corridor

Overview
- Status: Approved
- Owner: Indian Railways
- Locale: Gujarat
- Termini: Ahmedabad (Sarkhej); Dholera
- Stations: 14

Service
- Type: High-speed rail
- Rolling stock: Vande Bharat (trainset)

History
- Planned opening: 2031

Technical
- Line length: 134 km (83 mi)
- Character: Elevated and grade-separated
- Track gauge: Broad gauge
- Electrification: 25 kV 50 Hz AC (Overhead lines)
- Operating speed: 200 km/h (120 mph)

The Ahmedabad–Dholera High-Speed Rail Corridor is an approved high speed rail project of Indian Railways in the state of Gujarat.

The line will connect the state's largest city, Ahmedabad(sarkhej), to the Dholera Special Investment Region (SIR) and the upcoming Dholera International Airport. Indian Railways plans to commission the line by the year 2031.

The 134-kilometre (83 mi) long, broad-gauge, double-track corridor will have a design speed of 220 km/h as well as a 70 km (43 mi) long elevated viaduct. The corridor will utilize indigenous developed technologies, including rolling stock, signaling, and design standards.

The transition to these rails may lower the region's carbon footprint by cutting carbon dioxide emissions by an expected 20 million kilograms.

== Design ==
The project will utilize advanced, indigenously-manufactured broad-gauge trainsets currently under development by the Integral Coach Factory in Chennai. The rolling stock will have a top speed of 220 km/h and will be based on the Vande Bharat (trainset) platform.The project will have a 74 km long elevated viaduct, three mega bridges, 39 road-under-bridges and two rail-over-rail crossings

== Route and connectivity ==
The proposed railway corridor will begin at Sarkhej in Ahmedabad and extend towards Dholera. The project is planned to improve rail connectivity to the Dholera Special Investment Region, which is being developed as an industrial and manufacturing centre in Gujarat. The corridor will also provide connectivity to the upcoming Dholera Airport and the National Maritime Heritage Complex at Lothal.

According to the Ministry of Railways, the project is expected to benefit approximately 284 villages with a combined population of around 500,000 people. The improved railway connection is intended to facilitate faster commuting between Ahmedabad and Dholera and support same-day travel between the two areas.

The corridor forms part of a wider transport network being developed in the Ahmedabad–Dholera region. It is planned alongside road, airport and industrial infrastructure to improve multimodal connectivity.

== Project ==
The Ahmedabad–Dholera Semi High-Speed Rail Corridor was approved by the Cabinet Committee on Economic Affairs in May 2026. The project has an estimated cost of ₹20,667 crore and comprises approximately 134 km of double-track railway between Sarkhej in Ahmedabad and Dholera. The project is planned for completion during 2030–31. The Ministry of Railways has described it as the first semi-high-speed rail project of Indian Railways to use indigenously developed technology.

The corridor is intended to provide faster passenger connectivity between Ahmedabad and the Dholera region. It will connect the Dholera Special Investment Region (SIR), the upcoming Dholera Airport and the National Maritime Heritage Complex at Lothal with the Ahmedabad metropolitan area.

== Relationship with the Ahmedabad–Dholera Expressway ==
The railway corridor is being developed as part of the wider transport infrastructure between Ahmedabad and Dholera. The Ahmedabad Dholera Expressway provides road connectivity between the two regions, while provision has been made for the development of a semi-high-speed railway corridor along the expressway alignment.

The Government of India has stated that a 30-metre right-of-way for the proposed railway corridor was acquired along the Ahmedabad–Dholera Expressway. The railway is intended to complement the expressway by providing a dedicated passenger rail connection between Ahmedabad and the Dholera region.

== Project status ==
Western Railways invited bids for the project in September 2026. The final tender is expected to be awarded by December 2026, with construction expected to commence early next year.
