= Sabarmati Junction railway station =

Railway station in Gujarat, India

Sabarmati Junction
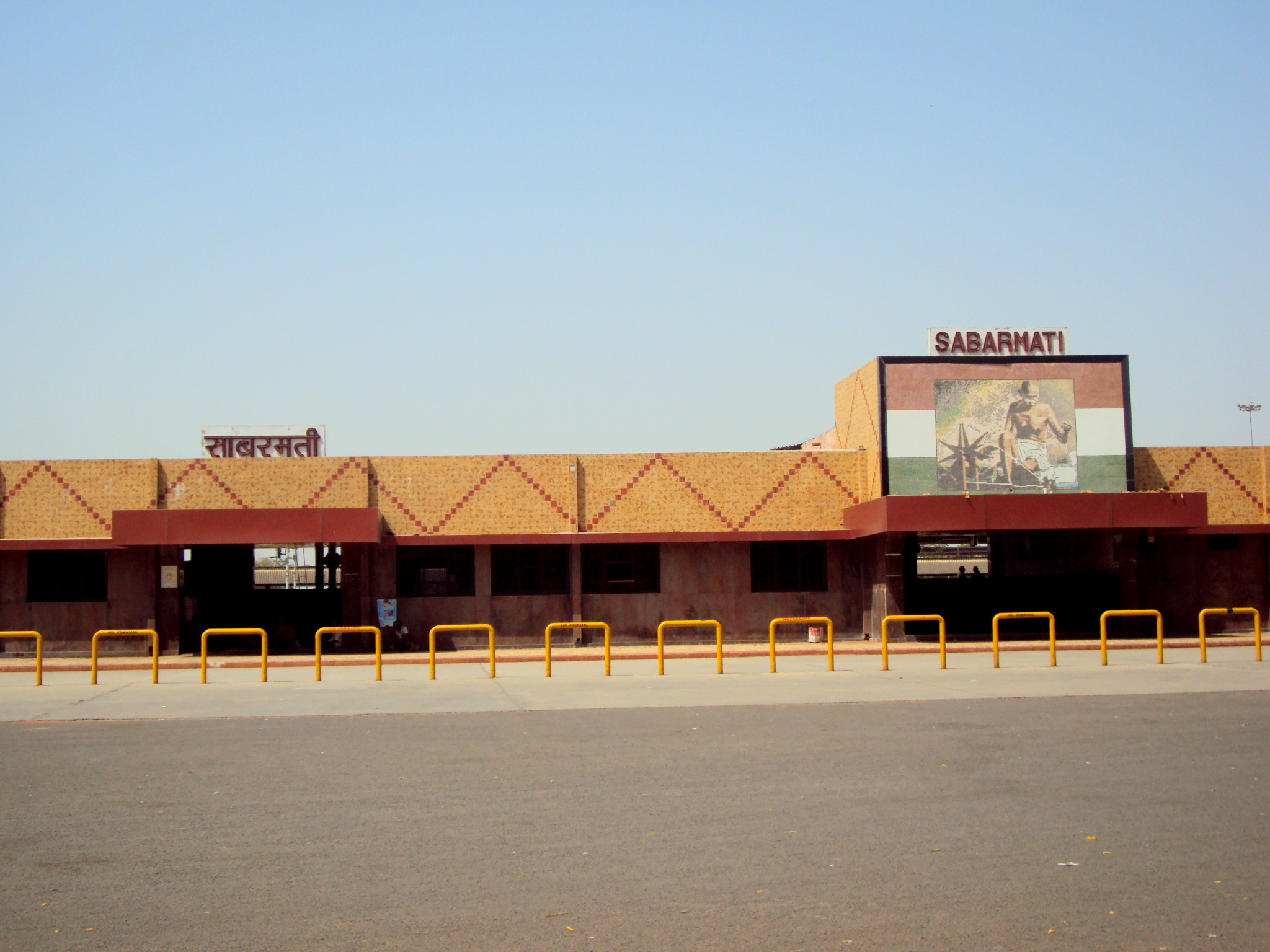
- Sabarmati Junction railway station

General information
- Location: Sabarmati, Ahmedabad, Gujarat; India
- Coordinates: 23°04′17″N 72°35′14″E
- Elevation: 55 metres (180 ft)
- System: Indian Railways station
- Owner: Indian Railways
- Operator: Western Railways
- Lines: Ahmedabad–Viramgam-Gandhidham line, Ahmedabad–Botad line
- Platforms: 3
- Tracks: 4
- Connections: Red Line Sabarmati Railway Station; AMTS and Janmarg; Sabarmati HSR (under-construction)

Construction
- Structure type: Standard (on-ground station)
- Parking: Yes
- Accessible: Accessible

Other information
- Status: Functioning
- Station code: Sabarmati Junction (SBT)
- Zone(s): Western Railway
- Division(s): Ahmedabad

History
- Rebuilt: 13 March 2021
Location
- Location within Ahmedabad Location within Gujarat Location within India
- Interactive map

Sabarmati Junction railway station is an important junction railway station in Ahmedabad, Gujarat, operated by Western Railway. It is located on the Ahmedabad–Viramgam–Gandhidham line and serves as one of the important railway stations in Ahmedabad, handling passenger, express, superfast, and long-distance trains.

== Parts of station ==
It is divided in two parts Sabarmati Junction (SBT) - Ranip and Sabarmati Junction BG (SBIB) - Dharmanagar. Sabarmati (SBT) lies on Ahmedabad–Viramgam-Gandhidham main line which contains three platforms. While Sabarmati (SBIB) lies of Ahmedabad–Delhi main line, Ahmedabad–Gandhinagar line and Ahmedabad–Botad line which contains seven platforms.

== Diesel locomotive shed ==
Diesel Loco Shed, Sabarmati holds over 121 EMD locomotives, including the WDP 4D, WDG4, WDG 4D, and WDG-5.

== Proposed features ==
The Indian Railway Stations Development Corporation selected Sabarmati Junction to be redeveloped in a public-private partnership. The corporation, a joint venture of the Rail Land Development Authority and the state-owned Ircon International, invited requests for qualifications to redevelop the station; nine applications from developers and funders were received.

The station's theme is the Dandi March led by Mahatma Gandhi, who lived in Sabarmati. The redevelopment planned to revamp and connect the existing Sabarmati broad-gauge lines for passenger convenience. The proposed Mumbai-Ahmedabad high-speed bullet train, developed by the National High Speed Rail Corporation Limited (NHSRCL), is expected to pass between the lines. The rebuilt station will have a passage to access the bullet-train corridor.

The Mumbai–Ahmedabad high-speed rail corridor, which is under construction, is expected to pass between the existing lines. According to IRSDC, the two stations will be redeveloped and integrated with each other, providing a smooth and easier access for passengers. This integration will also have a passage for accessing the high-speed bullet train corridor. The Sabarmati Junction redevelopment project includes:

- A proposed cost, for about 1,955,500 square metres (483.2 acres), of about ₹125 crore
- The redeveloped station will access the Ahmedabad Metro station, also under construction.
- Comfortable waiting rooms, retail shops, food and beverage stalls, entertainment venues, and other facilities
- Footbridge access
- Wheelchair-friendliness and green construction
