= Mumbai–Ahmedabad high-speed rail corridor =

Under-construction high-speed rail line in India

Mumbai–Ahmedabad High Speed Rail corridor

Overview
- Other name: MAHSR
- Status: Under construction
- Owner: NHSRCL
- Locale: Maharashtra; Gujarat; Dadra and Nagar Haveli and Daman and Diu
- Termini: Mumbai; Ahmedabad
- Stations: 12
- Website: www.nhsrcl.in

Service
- Type: High-speed rail
- System: Shinkansen
- Operator: NHSRCL
- Rolling stock: B28 (Vande Bullet), E10 Series Shinkansen

History
- Planned opening: 15 August 2027 (Surat to Bilimora); 2029 (Entire line)

Technical
- Line length: 508.18 km (315.77 mi)
- Character: Elevated, underground, undersea and grade-separated
- Track gauge: 1,435 mm (4 ft 8 1/2 in) standard gauge
- Electrification: 25 kV 50 Hz AC (Overhead lines)
- Operating speed: 320 km/h (200 mph)
- Signalling: ETCS Level 2

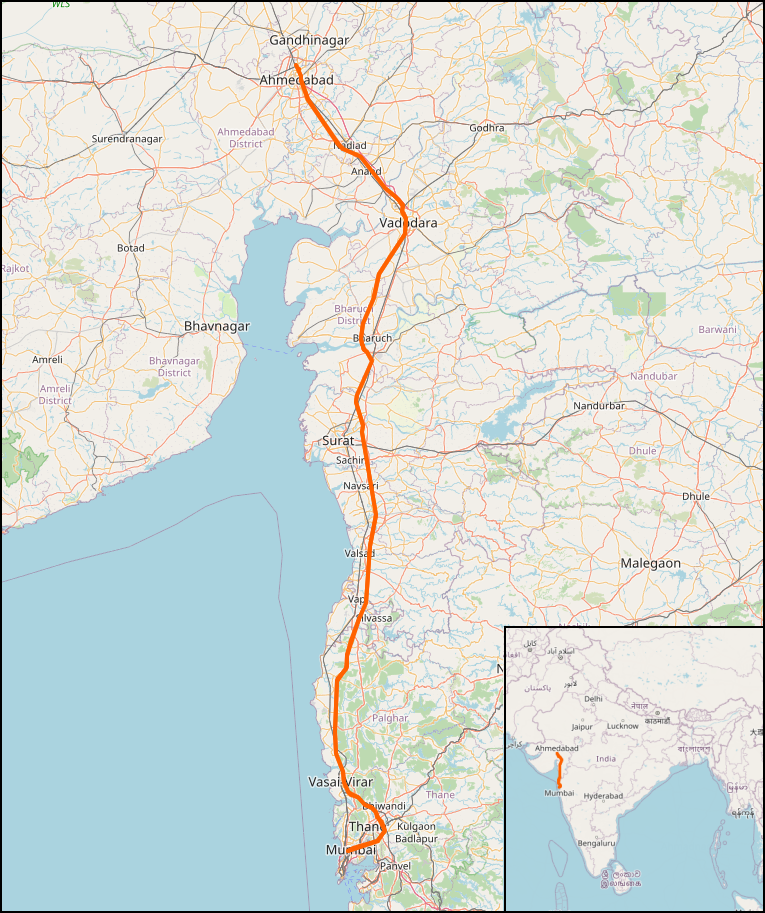
Map of Mumbai-Ahmedabad high-speed rail corridor.

The Mumbai–Ahmedabad High Speed Rail corridor (MAHSR) is an under-construction high-speed rail line, which will connect Mumbai, Maharashtra, the financial hub of India, with Ahmedabad, the largest city in the state of Gujarat. When completed, it will be India's first high-speed rail line, with a design speed of 350 km/h (215 mph), and the project will include a 353 km-long (219 mi) viaduct, which will be the longest bridge in the world.

The line is being developed by the National High Speed Rail Corporation Limited (NHSRCL), a wholly owned subsidiary of Indian Railways, the Ministry of Railways, and the Government of India. The line will use Shinkansen technology from Japan, including rolling stock, signalling and design standards – with technology transfer to support the Make in India programme.

After delays due to the COVID-19 pandemic, construction commenced in February 2021, when the NHSRCL began to pour concrete to cast the corridor's first pillar. An initial section between Surat and Bilimora in Gujarat, is planned to open for service on 15 August 2027, with the full line to open by 2029.

== History ==
=== Conception ===
The Mumbai–Ahmedabad corridor, along with five other high-speed rail corridors, was reintroduced for a feasibility study in the 2009–2010 Rail Budget. Multiple such feasibility studies had been carried out earlier. A 650 km (400 mi) long high-speed rail corridor was proposed to run from Pune to Ahmedabad via Mumbai. The point at which this route would touch Mumbai was to be decided when the feasibility report was prepared. The pre-feasibility study for the Ahmedabad–Mumbai–Pune corridor was completed by a consortium of RITES, Italferr, and Systra. The top speed expected for the corridor was set up to 350 km/h (220 mph). The proposed stations included Lonavala on the Mumbai–Pune section, and Surat, Bharuch, and Vadodara on the Mumbai–Ahmedabad section. It was proposed to have 32 services between Mumbai and Ahmedabad. Railway officials also proposed extending the corridor up to Bengaluru.

A Memorandum of Understanding (MoU) was signed in New Delhi on 14 February 2013, between the Ministry of Railways and the Société Nationale des Chemins de Fer Français (SNCF), the French national railways, for technical cooperation in the field of railways. The parties agreed to carry out jointly an "operations and development" feasibility project on the Mumbai–Ahmedabad high-speed rail corridor. The project was funded by the SNCF with support from the French Ministry of Finance. In March 2013, the Railway Board decided to drop the Mumbai–Pune section and operate the high-speed rail service only between Mumbai and Ahmedabad. The Board decided, due to financial constraints, that the Ghat section between Pune and Mumbai would escalate the budget for the project. According to Vidyadhar A. Malegaonkar, Chief Public Relations Officer (PRO), Western Railway, "It's a Western Railway project and a very small portion of Maharashtra was being covered under it. Hence, the Maharashtra government was showing little interest in the project and was also reluctant to bear a financial burden. That is the reason why the Railway Board has decided against including the Pune–Mumbai portion in the high-speed corridor".

India and Japan signed a MoU to undertake a joint feasibility study of the Mumbai–Ahmedabad route in New Delhi in September 2013. This was in pursuance of the Joint Statement between the then-Prime Minister of India, Manmohan Singh, and the Prime Minister of Japan, Shinzō Abe, on 29 May 2013, which provided that the two sides would co-finance a joint feasibility study of the route. The objective of the joint study was to prepare a feasibility report of the system with a speed of 300 to 350 km/h (190 to 220 mph). The cost of the study (¥500 million) was borne equally by India and Japan The study was scheduled to be completed within 18 months from its commencement, i.e., by July 2015. The study carried out traffic forecasting, and alignment surveys and undertook a comparative study of high-speed railway technology and systems.

Japan International Cooperation Agency (JICA) and the SNCF carried out studies on the project. JICA researched the technology, alignment, and traffic-related aspects, while SNCF worked on business projections. The feasibility study included an alignment survey concerning aspects such as land acquisition, environmental challenges, and the building of tunnels and bridges. It also suggested a financial model based on fare and non-fare box revenue.

=== Planning ===
JICA officials visited Mumbai in January 2014 to discuss the details of the project and made selective site visits to the proposed route. On 21 January, following several meetings between JICA and Indian Railways officials, it was proposed to originate the corridor at the Bandra Kurla Complex (BKC) in Mumbai. The proposed route would begin from BKC, go right up to Thane on the Central Line, and then take a diversion on the Trans-Harbour route, which is on the Thane-Diva-Vasai-Virar stretch. The corridor would then switch over to the Western Line, before entering Gujarat and terminating at Ahmedabad. 12 stations were proposed on the route, of which 8 would have been in Gujarat. The intention behind taking the route via Thane is to keep the option open to link the corridor to Pune. The team also proposed other options for originating the line at either Bandra Terminus or Lokmanya Tilak Terminus, if the BKC option was unfeasible. Air-conditioned bullet trains are expected to operate in the corridor at speeds of 320 km/h (200 mph), enabling commuters to traverse the 534 km (332 mi) distance in two hours. Currently, the fastest train operating in this sector is the Ahmedabad-Mumbai Vande Bharat Express, which takes 5 hours and 40 minutes to reach Mumbai Central from Ahmedabad, running non-stop between these two cities at a maximum speed of 130 km/h (81 mph).

The project held its first full-fledged meeting at the Railway Ministry in the first week of April 2014 to bring about a broad consensus on the project, especially between the governments of Maharashtra and Gujarat. The meeting was attended by representatives from the Maharashtra and Gujarat governments, the JICA, and the Railway Board officials. At the meeting, officials agreed to begin the line from BKC, and then take it to Thane and onward to Virar. The Maharashtra government was in favour of connecting the line with Belapur as well, to bring high-speed rail to Navi Mumbai. However, railway officials were opposed to the Belapur detour. Officials also discussed the need to ensure that the terminal at BKC would be connected to Line 3 of the Mumbai Metro, enabling commuters from South Mumbai to reach BKC.

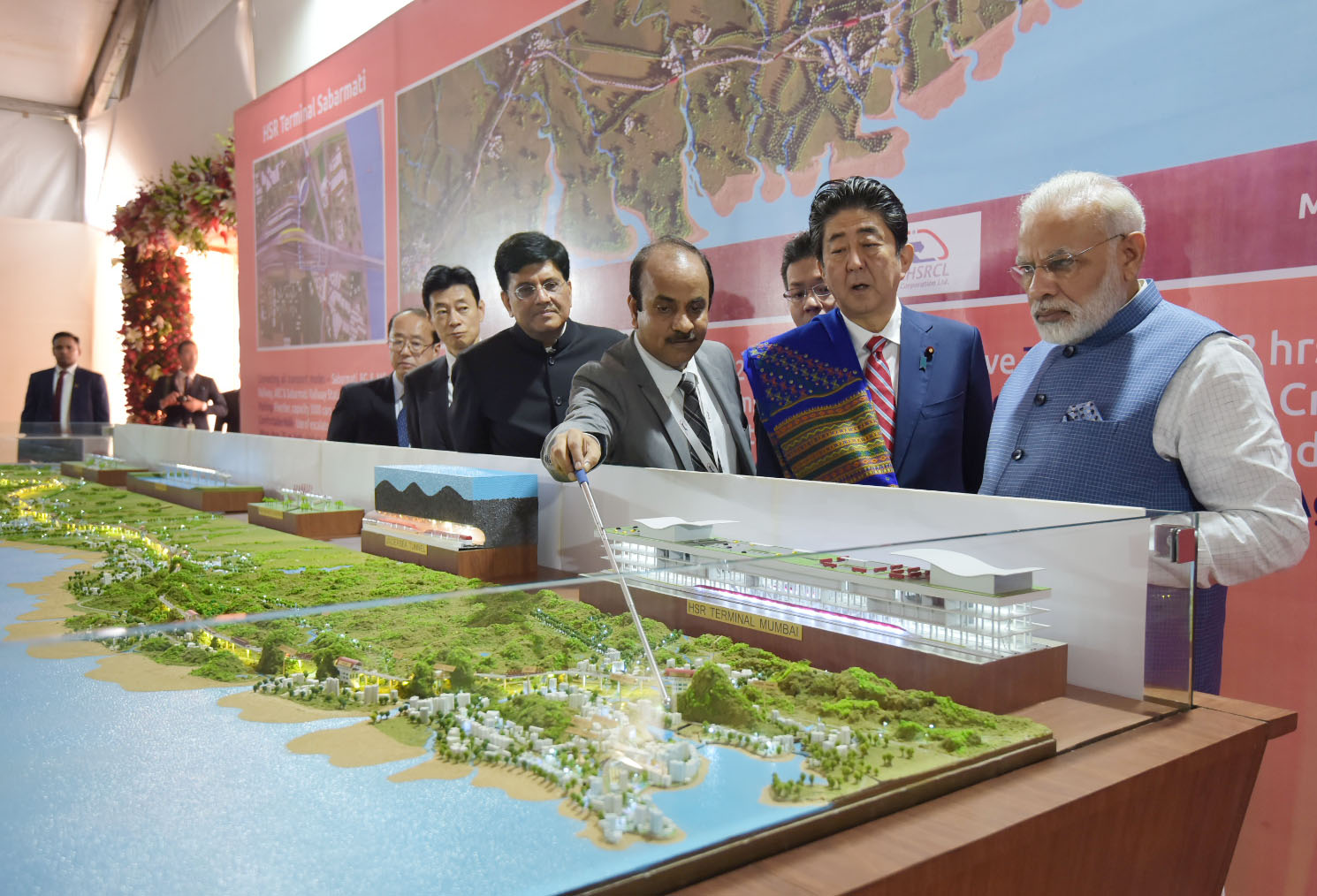
Prime ministers of India and Japan at the groundbreaking ceremony for the Mumbai-Ahmedabad high-speed rail project, at Ahmedabad in 2017.

In May 2014, the project was approved by Prime Minister Narendra Modi in a meeting with the chairman of the High-Speed Rail Corporation of India. The feasibility study on the project was carried out by RITES, Italferr, and Systra in July 2015. On 20 July 2015, a joint Japanese-Indian survey team recommended a Shinkansen-style system for the Mumbai–Ahmedabad line, including the adoption of Automatic train control and dedicated tracks. JICA's report recommended constructing 63.3% of the route an embankment slightly above the ground, 28.3% on stilts, 5.8% underground, and 2.2% on bridges. Minister of State for Railways Rajen Gohain informed Parliament on 15 March 2017 that under a new plan, the entire corridor would be elevated except for the tracks that were proposed to be built underground.

The Ministry of Railways, based on the recommendation of the NITI Aayog, announced that Shinkansen technology would be adopted for the line, with technology transfer to support the Make in India programme. Japan would also provide staff training. In January 2016, the Ministry of Railways fast-tracked the project and set up a Special Purpose Vehicle (SPV) named the National High-Speed Rail Corporation Limited to build and operate the corridor. The company was registered in January 2016 in the name of Indian Railways. It was planned for the company to eventually be made into a joint venture, with equity participation of the Maharashtra and Gujarat governments. The public sector company is expected to build and also carry out train operations. The Ministry of Railways, the National High-Speed Rail Corporation (NHSRCL) and JICA signed a tripartite consultancy agreement in December 2016 to implement the project. The NHSRCL, was a new agency floated to implement the project. A joint venture between Japan International Consultants for Transportation Co (JIC), Nippon Koei Co, and Oriental Consultants Global Co. Ltd. was appointed as the general consultants for the project, and prepared design documents, bidding documents and technical standards and specifications for the project.

In late 2016, JICA awarded the detailed design study for the project to a consortium led by Japan International Consultants for Transportation (JIC), Nippon Koei India Pvt. Ltd, and Oriental Consultants. The study formally began in March 2017. JIC will forecast demand, set fares, and devise a train operation plan, handle preliminary design work for structures such as tunnels and bridges, and draw up an overall construction schedule. The Japan International Consultants for Transportation (JIC) Project Manager stated that "conditions surrounding the construction of a high-speed railway in India – such as weather, which is harsh there, and the quality and standards of materials – are considerably different from those in Japan. So we are now comparing and adjusting to these technical matters." Japanese public and private sector companies conducted training programs for railway staff in India. JIC stated that the local expertise in India gained from constructing and operating various rapid transit systems could be utilised for the high-speed rail project. Japan also provided training to Indian Railway Ministry officials, some of whom studied in government-sponsored programs at graduate schools in Japan. India and Japan signed an agreement to establish an HSR Training Institute in India by 2020 to train railway staff in high-speed rail operations.

The project received clearance from the National Board for Wildlife (NBWL) in January 2019 to carry out construction in and around the wildlife areas. The Board required the NHSRCL to create safe passages for animals to pass through before beginning construction, and to erect noise barriers and fencing to prevent any disturbance to wildlife during construction.

The project received conditional clearance to cut down 53,467 mangrove trees, spread over an area of 13.36 hectares from the expert appraisal committee (EAC) on Coastal Regulation Zone (CRZ) projects of the Union Ministry of Environment and Forests on 18 March 2019. The Ministry required the NHSRCL to obtain approval from the Bombay High Court and clearance from the Dahanu Taluka Environment Protection Authority. The NHSCRL is also required to conduct a study on the impact of the vibrations from the trains on the birds and mudflats in the Thane Creek Flamingo Sanctuary. The NHSRCL approached the Bombay High Court for approval on 8 April 2019. The NHSRCL announced in June 2019 that it had altered the proposed design of Thane station which would save 21,000 mangrove trees. As a result, only 32,044 mangroves are affected by the project.

=== Design ===
The design for the bridges, viaducts and tunnels was made by engineers based in Delhi, Mumbai, and Japan. The corridor is 508.09 km (315.71 mi) long and traverses the states of Maharashtra and Gujarat, and the union territory of Dadra and Nagar Haveli. The alignment comprises 460.3 km (286.0 mi) of viaducts (90.6% of route length), 25.87 km (16.07 mi) of tunnels (5.1%), 12.9 km (8.0 mi) of cut and fill (2.5%) and 9.22 km (5.73 mi) of bridges (1.8%). A 21 km (13 mi) tunnel connects Thane and Virar, of which 7 km (4.3 mi) will be undersea. The undersea tunnel was chosen to avoid damaging the thick vegetation present in the area. The corridor will begin at the underground station in the Bandra-Kurla Complex in Mumbai, and then traverse 21 km (13 mi) underground before emerging above ground at Thane.

=== Cost ===
The project was estimated to cost ₹1.1 lakh crore (US$16.4 billion in 2017 dollars), including the cost of 24 trainsets, interest during construction, and import duties. JICA agreed, in 2017, to fund 81% of the total project cost ₹88,087 crore (equivalent to ₹1.3 trillion or US$14 billion in 2026), through a 50-year, 1.5 trillion Japanese yen loan, at an interest rate of 0.1% with a moratorium on repayments up to 15 years, and the remaining cost will be borne by the state governments of Maharashtra and Gujarat. 20% of the components used on the corridor will be supplied by Japan, and manufactured in India.

Most of the line will be constructed on an elevated corridor to avoid land acquisitions and the need to build underpasses. It will also enhance safety by eliminating the need for level crossings. The decision to construct an elevated line raised the cost of the project project by an additional ₹10,000 crore (US$1.1 billion).

Railway Minister, Piyush Goyal, informed the Parliament that ₹3,226.8 crore (US$340 million) had been spent on the project as of June 2019.

The expenditure already incurred rose to ₹28,442 crore (US$3.0 billion) by July 2022, even as analysis suggested a 48% cost escalation in the project to ₹1.6 lakh crore (US$17 billion) due to the COVID-19 pandemic and land acquisition issues. To As of October 2024, ₹67,486 crore (equivalent to ₹720 billion or US$7.7 billion in 2026) had been spent, and 47% of civil works was completed.

==== JICA ODA loan tranches ====
The following tranches were loaned by JICA as Official Development Assistance (ODA):

1. Sep 2017 - ¥250 billion, around ₹18,000 crore (equivalent to ₹280 billion or US$2.9 billion in 2026)
2. Sep 2017 - ¥10.453 billion, around ₹640 crore (equivalent to ₹980 crore or US$100 million in 2026), for a training institute at Vadodara, Gujarat.
3. Sep 2018 - ¥89.547 billion, around ₹5,500 crore (equivalent to ₹80 billion or US$860 million in 2026)
4. Jul 2022 - ¥100 billion, around ₹6,000 crore (equivalent to ₹69 billion or US$740 million in 2026)
5. Mar 2023 - ¥300 billion, ₹18,750 crore (equivalent to ₹200 billion or US$2.2 billion in 2026)
6. Dec 2023 - ¥400 billion, ₹22,627 crore (equivalent to ₹250 billion or US$2.6 billion in 2026)

Total: ¥1,150 billion (₹55,317 crore, $10.13 billion)

=== Land acquisition ===
Survey work on the route began in January 2017. According to NHSRCL director Mukul Saran Mathur, "The geotechnical surveys have started along the entire route between Mumbai and Ahmedabad, and are expected to take two to three months. The activities that have begun include geo-technical and geo-physical investigations into the 21-kilometre, under-water tunnel of the project, as well as the Final Location Survey to mark the alignment, right down to the pillars on which the high-speed trains will run." RITES identified 750 locations along the entire route to carry out soil testing, including 62 locations for the underground section. The agency completed soil testing at a total of 250 locations by 24 February. Officials carried out testing of soil and rocks at a depth of 70 metres underwater for the undersea tunnel stretch.

Railway officials utilised a helicopter mounted with a 100-megapixel, high-resolution digital camera, a Light Detection and Ranging (LiDAR) scanner, a data recorder, and other equipment to carry out the survey. This aerial survey method provides accurate data about land contours, buildings and vegetation, and will permit the survey work to be completed within 9 to 10 weeks as opposed to the six to eight months required for a regular survey. The helicopter completed its survey of the entire route within a flying time of 30 hours, and the rest of the time is required for data processing. The aerial survey was completed by JICA and the Indian Railways by the end of February 2017. Railway Ministry officials stated in April 2017 that final location surveys had been completed, and that consultants to carry out environmental and social impact studies would be appointed within a few months.

Indian Prime Minister Narendra Modi and Japanese Prime Minister Shinzo Abe laid the foundation stone for the project in Ahmedabad on 14 September 2017. All geotechnical surveys and tests under the seabed for the underground section were completed by December 2017. Civil construction of the corridor was expected to begin by June 2018, and the project was scheduled to be completed in 2023. The deadline was advanced to have the bullet train go on its first run on 15 August 2022 on the occasion of India's 75th Independence Day. However, surveys and land acquisition for the project faced delays and disruptions due to protests by farmers, land owners, and members of the Maharashtra Navnirman Sena party, which opposes the bullet train project. The deadline to complete land acquisition was postponed from December 2018 to December 2019 as a result of the protests. Railway Minister Piyush Goyal stated in July 2019 that the project was expected to be completed by December 2023. In February 2020, Maharashtra Chief Minister Uddhav Thackeray called the project a "white elephant" and questioned whether anyone would benefit from it. The Shiv Sena has also blocked land acquisition attempts causing delays to the project.

A total of 1,434.4 hectares of land will be required for the project, including private, government, forest and railway land. The Railway Ministry stated that it had only been able to acquire 21.02 hectares, or about 1.46% of the total land required for the project as of 18 December 2018. NHSRCL officials stated on 16 January 2019 that they had received the consent for land acquisition from 61 out of the 104 villages in Maharashtra that were located along the proposed route. Officials in Gujarat stated that land acquisition was expected to be completed only by the end of 2019. As of May 2019, 60% of land acquisition in Gujarat was completed.

A report by news agency IANS quoted an unnamed NHSRCL official as stating that 39% of the total land acquisition had been completed as of June 2019. The official stated that 471 of 940 hectares of land were acquired in Gujarat and 66 of 431 hectares in Maharashtra. In August 2019, Minister of State for Railways Suresh Angadi informed Parliament that 297 villages were located along the proposed route in Gujarat and 97% of land owners in the state had consented to land acquisition but the government was still facing challenges acquiring land in certain pockets of Maharashtra. NHSRCL Managing Director Achal Khare stated that 45% of total land acquisition for the project was complete as of September 2019. The Gujarat High Court dismissed a batch of petitions filed by farmers challenging the acquisition of their lands for the project later in the same month.

On 29 January 2020, Railway Board Chairman VK Yadav stated that 47% of the total land required for the project had been acquired. Maharashtra had only acquired 101.04 hectares out of the total 432 hectares required for the project, with no land having been acquired in Mumbai as of February 2021. Gujarat had completed 94% of total land acquisition (901.86 of 956.15 hectares). Railway Minister Piyush Goyal stated that the project would not be completed by 2023 due to land acquisition delays in Maharashtra. He also confirmed that the Railways would proceed with the tendering process in Gujarat as the state had acquired, 94% of the required land.

In September 2021, the NHSRCL stated that it had acquired 30% of the required land in Maharashtra, 97% in Gujarat and had completed, land acquisition in Dadra and Nagar Haveli.

As of March 2022, over 89% of the required land had been acquired: 98% in Gujarat, 68% in Maharashtra, and 100% in Dadra and Nagar Haveli, and Daman and Diu.

As of February 2023, 100% of the land required in Maharashtra had been acquired; with the Bombay High Court rejecting an appeal by Godrej & Boyce against the acquisition of land, whereby the offered monetary compensation of Rs 264 crore (INR 2.64 billion) for the purchase of 39,252 sq m (9.69 acres) of corporate land was contested by Godrej on 15 September 2022.

== Construction ==
The NHSRCL has divided the civil construction work of the 508 km long Mumbai–Ahmedabad High-Speed Rail project into 8 packages as given below:

Sr. No	Package	Length in km	Contractor
C1.	Underground station at Bandra Kurla Complex (BKC), Mumbai	1.02	Megha Engineering (MEIL) – Hindustan Construction Company (JV)
C2.	Underground tunnel between BKC and Shilphata (Thane district)	20.37	Afcons Infrastructure
C3.	Viaduct between Shilphata (Thane) and Zaroli village (Valsad district)	135.45	Larsen & Toubro
C4.	Viaduct between Zaroli village (Valsad) and Vadodara	237.10	Larsen & Toubro
C5.	Viaduct and station within Vadodara	8.19	Larsen & Toubro
C6.	Viaduct between Vadodara and Ahmedabad	87.56	Larsen & Toubro
C7.	Viaduct and station within Ahmedabad	18.13	IRCON – DRA Infracon (JV)
C8.	Viaduct and building works at Sabarmati depot	2.12	SCC Infrastructure Ltd – VRS Construction Ltd (JV)
D1.	Depot at Thane		DRA Infracon – DMRC (JV)
D2.	Depot at Sabarmati		Larsen & Toubro – Sojitz Corporation (JV)

The NHSCR floated tenders for the construction of the undersea tunnel on 23 April 2019. A tender for works between Vadodara and Ahmedabad was floated in August 2019. In January 2021, the NHSRCL invited final bids for the construction of the Mumbai terminal. The agency floated tenders for construction of the Sabarmati depot in August 2021. The NHSRCL reinvented the tender for the underground HSR station at BKC grounds, Mumbai, on 22 August 2022. It has also reinvented the vendor for India's longest undersea tunnel of 21 km on 23 September 2022.

The NHSRCL stated that construction work on the project would create 90,000 direct and indirect jobs, including more than 51,000 technician jobs. The NHSRCL announced that it had cast the first full height pier for the project near Vapi, Gujarat, on 31 July 2021.

A Full Span Launching Equipment-Straddle Carrier and Girder Transporter was deployed for use in the project in September 2021. The equipment was indigenously designed and manufactured at Larsen & Toubro's manufacturing facility in Kanchipuram, Tamil Nadu. Over 30 such machines will be used in the construction of the project.

As of 27 February 2025, 394 kilometres (245 mi) of pier foundations, 375 kilometres (233 mi) of piers, 320 kilometres (200 mi) of girder castings, 293 kilometres (182 mi) of viaducts, 150 kilometres (93 mi) of noise barriers, and 143 kilometres (89 mi) of track bed had been completed, but track laying had not yet begun. Assembly process on an TBM was reported to have been underway on 9th April 2026 and it is estimated to start excavation work within 97 days.

== Infrastructure and operations ==
Indian Railways proposes to operate two types of services on the corridor. A "Rapid Train" or express service with only two stops at Surat and Vadodara, and a slower service that stops at all stations. The "Rapid Train" would complete the journey in 2 hours and 7 minutes, while the slower service would take 2 hours and 58 minutes. In total, 70 daily services will be operated on the line, or 35 services in each direction, with 3 services per hour during peak hours and 2 services per hour during off-peak hours. The Railways estimates that the high-speed rail corridor will have a daily ridership of around 36,000 in 2023. Trains will operate between 6:00am and midnight. Currently, a train journey from Mumbai to Ahmedabad takes 7 hours. Courtesy to passengers in train rides will be emphasised, similar to the Japanese counterparts, such as train drivers greeting passenger with "Namaste" at the start and end of a railway trip.

On 9 January 2017, at the Vibrant Gujarat Summit, the Gujarat Government and the National High-Speed Rail Corporation Limited (NHSRCL) signed an MoU worth ₹67,000 crore (US$7.2 billion) for component manufacturing for the high-speed rail corridor. The Gujarat Government will bear 25% of the total project cost and provide land for the project.

Detailed Operation Plan	1st Year	10th Year	20th Year	30th Year
Train configuration	10	10/16	16	16
Number of rakes	24	24+11	44	71
Number of trains (per day/one direction)	35	51	64	105
Train capacity	750	750/1250	1250	1250
Passenger seats (day/one direction)	17,900	31,700	56,800	92,900
Number of trains (per day/one direction) Peak Hour	3	4	6	8
Number of trains (per day/one direction) Off-peak	2	3	3	6

=== Rolling stock ===
In July 2023, the NHSRCL opened a tender for the supply of twenty-four enhanced E5 Series Shinkansen train-sets, of which 6 were to be assembled in India.

NHSRCL had sought E5 train sets modified to operate under Indian weather. Trains in Japan can withstand temperatures of up to 35 degrees Celsius, but the Indian trains will be able to operate at temperatures exceeding 50 degrees Celsius; this can be achieved with the use of special cooling systems and air conditioners. Fine mesh dust filters will be fitted on air conditioners, blowers, and other important equipment on the Indian high-speed trains to keep dust out. Another modification is the provision of extra space to store heavy luggage by removing a few seats from the last coach of each train. Trains were proposed to have a length of between 10 and 16 coaches. Each train will have a passenger capacity of between 1,300 and 1,600 passengers. The system will be designed to operate trains at a maximum speed of 350 kilometres per hour (220 mph), while the operational speed would be 320 kilometres per hour (200 mph). Trains will be equipped with multi-purpose rooms that contain foldable beds for feeding mothers and patients, and the rooms will also be fitted with mirrors and baggage racks. Additionally, the seating arrangement may be slightly reduced by two seats per coach.

According to an article from The Financial Express, the existing HVAC systems are usually sufficient, but a few minor layout adjustments are needed to maximise performance. To control dust levels, filter cleaning frequency must increase. The heavier weight of the cooling equipment was a hurdle throughout the redesign phase since it could affect energy efficiency. The power needed to maintain high speeds rises with weight, which may have an impact on the train's overall performance. To make matters more complicated, Indian passengers' average weight, including their luggage, is greater than that of Japanese passengers. A weight calculation analysis showed that simply by providing fewer seats, the Shinkansen in India could keep its weight similar to that of Japan's.

In June 2024, NHSRCL placed a contract with the Chennai based Integral Coach Factory, for the design and manufacture of two standard gauge, 8 stainless-steel car, train-sets, which were previously set to be capable of 220 km/h (135 mph) operation, with a possible maximum speed of 250 km/h (155 mph), to currently being designed to run at an average speed of 250 km/h and at a maximum speed of 280 km/h, and based on the Vande Bharat Express. The Integral Coach Factory initiated a tender, to sub-contract the manufacture, on 5 September, which was accepted by BEML Ltd on 19 September. Railway sources estimate that the production of the two trains will take more than two years, at around ₹200 crore to ₹250 crore per train. Now, the project costs Rs 866.87 crore and each individual coach costing Rs 27.86 crore. The trains will feature air-conditioning, reclining seats, amenities for passengers with mobility challenges, and entertainment systems. The first prototype is expected to start trials in December 2026.BEML further secured a fresh order of 16 more trainsets from NHSRCL in september 2026 , the order is worth more than Rs 5400 crore.

According to a report made by The Japan Times, Japan would provide two used Shinkansen train sets, the E5 series and the E3 series, free of charge, to allow for testing of the line to take place prior to opening.

=== Signaling and power ===
The corridor will utilise European Train Control System (ETCS) Level 2 signalling, rated for operations up to 350 km/h. In June 2025, NHSRCL awarded a ₹4,100 crore contract for the design, installation, and 15 year maintenance of the line's signalling and telecommunications to a consortium led by Dineshchandra R Agrawal Infracon, Siemens Limited, and Siemens Mobility. The ETCS infrastructure will be fully interoperable with the planned E10 series rolling stock, an integration with precedent on the Taiwan High-Speed Rail.

The NHSRCL estimated that the corridor would consume around 110 crore units of electricity annually once operational. Consumption was expected to rise in 2033 when additional services were planned to be introduced. A total of 29 substations will supply electricity to the corridor. The NHSRCL finalised the locations for the substations by January 2018 and approached power utility companies in Gujarat and Maharashtra to conduct joint surveys, which were completed by April 2018. The NHSRCL acquired 39,540 square feet of land from the Godrej and Boyce Manufacturing Company at Vikhroli in May 2018 to construct the ventilation shaft and distribution and traction sub-stations for the corridor.

Solar panels installed at the Sabarmati and Thane stations, at the High-Speed Rail Training Institute in Vadodara, and at the Sabarmati HSR Complex will generate solar power.

=== Operator ===
The National High-Speed Rail Corporation Limited (NHSRCL) was registered under the Companies Act, 2013 on 12 February 2016. The NHSRCL is a special purpose vehicle responsible for the implementation of the Mumbai–Ahmedabad high-speed rail project. In October 2016, the Indian Railways invited applications to fill key positions in the NHSRCL.

=== Fares ===
The detailed project report proposed fares that would be 1.5 times that of a First-Class AC ticket on the Mumbai–Ahmedabad Duronto Express. In September 2019, the NHSRCL stated that the end-to-end fare on the corridor was expected to be ₹3,000 (US$32), and the minimum fare would be ₹250 (US$2.70).

Trains will have business and standard sections with 2x2 and 2x3 seating configurations, respectively. Unlike Japanese Shinkansen coaches, the last coach on Indian trains will have a few seats removed to make space to store check-in luggage. NHSRCL Managing Director Achal Khare stated that Japanese passengers typically travel light, but the modification was made to accommodate Indian passengers. The coaches have sufficient overhead space for hand baggage but not for heavy luggage. The NHSRCL stated that it would charge passengers an additional fee for check-in luggage to discourage travellers from bringing too many pieces of heavy luggage. Passengers who travel with check-in luggage would be seated in the same coach in which check-in luggage is stored.

=== Depots ===
The corridor uses three depots at Sabarmati and Surat in Gujarat, and Thane in Maharashtra. The depots were designed based on the operations at Japan's Sendai and Kanazawa depots for Shinkansen. The Sabarmati depot is spread over an area of 80 hectares and serves as the main depot for the line. It also houses the operation control centre for the corridor. The Thane depot is spread over an area of 60 hectares. The Sabarmati and Thane depots contain washing plants, inspection bays, sheds, workshops, and stabling lines for regular maintenance of trains. The Surat depot is the smallest, with an area of 44 hectares. It contains basic facilities for train maintenance.

All depots contain reservoirs for rainwater harvesting, and collected water is passed through treatment plants within the depot before being reused for washing trainsets. Depots also have recharge pits for recharging water back into the earth. The Thane and Surat depots are also capable of recycling and reusing effluent and sewage water. Bio-waste from the trains is stored in tanks onboard and removed at depots, where it is then treated in sewage treatment plants.

== Stations ==
The line will have 12 stations at Mumbai, Thane, Virar, Boisar, Vapi, Bilimora, Surat, Bharuch, Vadodara, Anand/Nadiad (Kheda district), Ahmedabad and Sabarmati. High speed rail stations will be constructed either above or next to existing railway stations to provide transfer with the Indian Railways network. The Director of the Railway Bureau of Japan's Ministry of Land, Infrastructure, Transport and Tourism stated that "this makes construction extremely difficult".

=== Structure of each station ===
Platform format of each station (crossing lines omitted)
Wiring classification	Platform 2 Arrival and Departure Line 4	Platform 2 Arrival and Departure Line + Passing Line	Platform 2, arrival and departure lines + passing lines	Platform 2, arrival and departure lines
Internal diagram				
Adoption site	Thane, Surat, Vadodara, Sabarmati	Virar, Vapi, Bilimora, Anand/Kheda	Boisar, Bharuch	Ahmedabad

Endpoint station platform form
Wiring classification	Arrival and departure line on platform 3, platform 6
Internal diagram	
Adoption site	Mumbai

=== Mumbai terminal ===
The Indian Railways proposed making the proposed terminus at BKC as a three-storey underground station. However, the Maharashtra state government planned to construct the International Financial Services Centre (IFSC) at BKC on the same plot. JICA's report had cited the BKC plot as the most suitable location to build the Mumbai terminus. In February 2016, the Railways and the state government came to an agreement to construct both projects at the BKC. However, in April 2016, the state government refused to permit construction of the underground station at BKC, citing the lack of availability of land in the area for an underground station after the completion of the proposed IFSC and its multi-level underground car park. The state government also stated that IFSC would begin generating revenue for the government shortly, while the rail corridor was only expected to be completed by 2023. It instead suggested relocating the proposed BKC terminus to either Matunga or Kanjurmarg. The issue was resolved in January 2017, when the Maharashtra Government and the MMRDA agreed to provide 5.4 hectares of land in BKC to construct a terminus. Lines 2 and 3 of the Mumbai Metro will meet the HSR at BKC.

=== Vadodara ===
Platform 6 of the Vadodara Junction station will be used as the platform for the bullet train. The NHSRCL will revamp the existing station to accommodate high-speed rail services. This will involve the removal of the reservation centre, section engineering office, water tank and railway police station located on the existing platform. The new station building will have a height of 20–22 metres and will be 40 metres in width. The design of the station is inspired by the banyan tree. The project requires the dismantling of platform 7. The largest girder on the high-speed rail corridor, measuring 220 metres in length, will be located at Vadodara station. The construction of the girder will require the dismantling of platform 7 of Vadodara Junction station, which is used by trains arriving from Delhi. To cope with the loss of the platform, the NHRSCL will build a new Chhayapuri as a satellite station. Chhayapuri station was inaugurated in December 2019, paving the way for officials to go ahead with the dismantling of platform 7 at Vadodara Junction.

=== Ahmedabad Terminal ===
The Sabarmati station will serve as the high-speed rail terminal in Ahmedabad. A new high speed rail terminal will be built on the eastern side of the station above the existing platforms 10, 11 and 12. The Ahmedabad Metro will connect the HSR at Ahmedabad Junction (Kalupur station).

== Extensions ==
=== Delhi–Ahmedabad HSR ===
The Delhi-Ahmedabad high-speed rail corridor (DAHSR) and the Mumbai–Ahmedabad High-speed Rail Corridor (MAHSR) will together form the Delhi-Mumbai high-speed rail Corridor (DMHSR).

DAHSR, which will be 886 km (551 mi) long, will pass through Delhi, Haryana (78.22 km (48.60 mi)), Rajasthan and Gujarat will be travelled within 3–4 hours, with a maximum speed of 350 km/h (220 mph) and an average speed of 250 km/h (160 mph). It will start from Dwarka Sector 21 in Delhi, run along the Dwarka Expressway to Gurugram, with its stop at Manesar, then along the Gurugram-Jaipur rail line to Rewari, and then along NH-48 to Jaipur to Sabarmati (the last stop of MAHSR).

== Project status ==
=== Overview ===
As of 31 October 2026
Work	Progress								
Work	2018	2019	2020	2021	2022	2023	2024	2025	2026
Land acquisition	1.4%	45%	64%	78%	99%	99%	100%		
Piling	0%			2.5%	36%	74%	75.1%	85.5%	95%
Piers	0%			2.5%	25%	57%	73%	84%	95%
Viaduct	0%				3.4%	24%	52.3%	71.4%	80.6%
Track bed	0%						7%	21.4%	43.7%
OHE mast	0%							12.3%	46.5%
Track	0%								20.7%

Citations:

=== 2017 ===
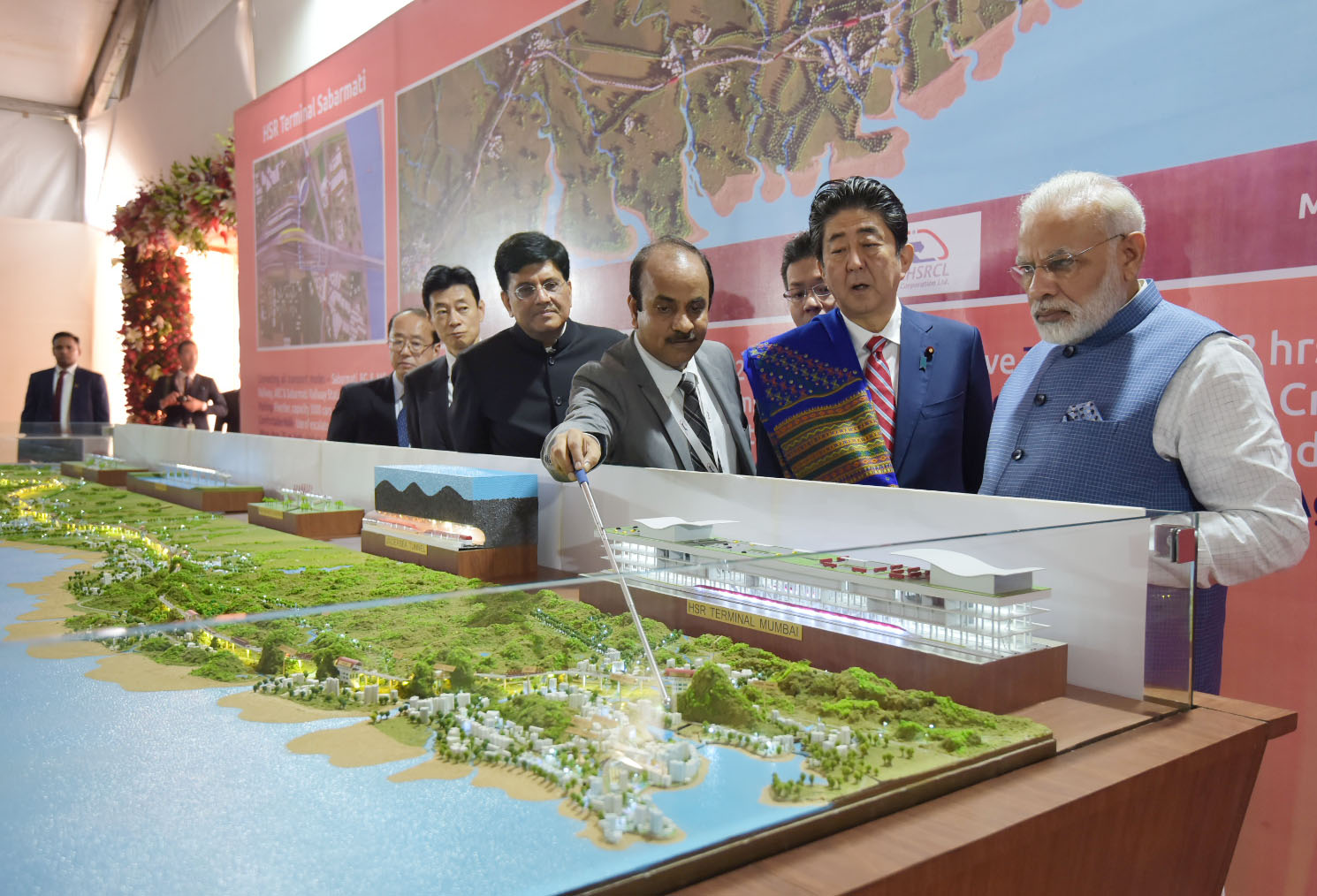
Prime ministers of India and Japan at the groundbreaking ceremony for the Mumbai-Ahmedabad high-speed rail project, at Ahmedabad.

In September 2017, the construction work was flagged off by Japanese Prime Minister Shinzō Abe and the Prime Minister of India, Narendra Modi in Ahmedabad. The E5 Series Shinkansen trains were slated to utilise the corridor at a maximum operational speed of 320 km/h (200 mph) and an average speed of 260 km/h (162 mph).

=== 2020 ===
With land acquisition issues and the COVID-19 pandemic, the project faced a setback, and the construction works were thereby delayed. In July, about 60% of the required land was acquired, and the rest was said to be on the verge of completion. Civil works tenders covering 68% corridor (345 km (214 mi) out of 508 km (316 mi), of 245 km (152 mi) 77% land in Gujarat, 80% in Dadra & Nagar Haveli and 22% in Maharashtra) and a separate tender for 28 steel bridges were allocated, with the remaining tendering process awarded later. By the end of the year, the contract for a stretch of 88 km (55 mi), about 17% of the total length of 508 km (316 mi) was awarded.

=== 2021 ===
In February 2021, Larsen and Toubro (L&T) began the Pier Works, marking a major milestone of the project. In May, L&T started pouring concrete to cast the first pier of the corridor. In July, Railway Minister, Ashwini Vaishnaw reviewed the entire project. According to PTI report, out of the 74% of land acquired until this date, the majority of 96% fell in Gujarat, while only 25% fell in the state of Maharashtra. Besides, 96% of the land needed for the project in Dadra and Nagar Haveli had already been acquired. In the following month, NHSRCL invited bids for design, construction, installation, testing and commissioning of Sabarmati Depot that consisted of a workshop, inspection sheds, various buildings, maintenance facilities and associated works. Later in August, NHSRCL completed casting of the first full height (13.05 m (42.8 ft)) pier of corridor. The pier was cast with 183 cubic metres of concrete quantity and 18.820 MT of steel.

On 10 September, L&T inaugurated the first indigenously designed and manufactured 'Full Span Launching Equipment-Straddle Carrier and Girder Transporter' to expedite the construction of viaduct for Mumbai- Ahmedabad High Speed Rail corridor. On 29 September, it was announced the 50 km (31 mi) stretch from Surat to Bilimora would be operational by 2026, while the remainder of the Gujarat section was expected to be completed by 2024. In October, the joint venture of IRCON International and DRA Infracon won package C7 on 4 October, comprising a viaduct between Anand and Sabarmati, including 2 HSR stations at Sabarmati and Ahmedabad. NHSRCL then invited the bids for the tunnelling work on 21 kilometres underground, including a 7 kilometre long undersea tunnel on 30 October.

In November, the casting of 970-tonne full span pre-stressed concrete (PSC) box girder began near Naslipore village, Navsari district, Gujarat. NHSRCL then erected the first full span 40 m (130 ft) box girder of the corridor, near Navsari. By the end of the year, NHSRCL had acquired 40.39% of the total land required for the project in Maharashtra. It was said that the construction work would not commence until 80-90% of the land was acquired. While in the case of Gujarat, 98.5% of the land was acquired.

=== 2022 ===
On 21 January 2022, the first track contract was signed by NHSRCL with contractor IRCON International to design, supply and construct the tracks. Two Japanese companies, Japanese Railway Track Consultants (JRTC) and Japanese Railway Technical Service (JARTS) were set to work closely with IRCON. This contract covered about 47% of the total length of the project, starting from the Maharashtra-Gujarat Border to Vadodara in Gujarat. In February, NHSRCL awarded the final civil contract worth ₹ 2,460.88 crores for L&T to design and develop 8 km (5.0 mi) of the viaduct and a station in Vadodara, marking the successful awarding of 100% civil contracts for the construction of alignments in Gujarat, including eight stations and two rolling stock depots at Sabarmati and Surat respectively. By June, around 90.3% of the total required land (98.78% of the land required in Gujarat, and 71.49% in Maharashtra) had been acquired. The first train was expected to run, on a 51 km (32 mi) section, between Surat and Bilimora, in 2026. In July, JICA signed a loan agreement worth ₹6000 Crores with the Government of India as an ODA loan for the project.

=== 2023 ===
In January, the first of the 50 m long rail level slabs had been placed at Surat station. Later in April, the first rail tunnel of the project near Valsad was under construction; 67 metres of this 350-metre-long tunnel had been excavated. On 18 August 2023, NHSRCL announced the successful completion of the bridge over the Auranga river in Valsad district. 80 km (50 mi) of viaducts were then completed. On 2 October, a new track-slab manufacturing facility, for the production of track-slabs required for the construction of ballastless track works for the corridor, was commissioned near Anand, Gujarat. The fully automated facility would produce track slabs for 116 km (72 mi) of the double-line high-speed rail track for the corridor. The facility, spanning an area of 100,000 square metres, will produce 45,000 precast track slabs for the project. 91 km (57 mi) of viaduct were completed at a rate of 2 km (1.2 mi) of viaducts per week. Later on 6 October, NHSRCL had successfully erected the first steel bridge, measuring 70 m (230 ft), over National Highway 53 in Surat in Gujarat; this bridge was the first among the 28 steel bridges planned for the corridor.

=== 2024 ===
On 8 January, the land acquisition for the entire corridor was completed. On 16 January, L&T was awarded package no. EW-1 of the project, which involves electrification works across its entire 508 kilometres (316 mi) length. The scope of this package includes commissioning a 2 x 25 kV overhead electrification system to enable the line's trains to operate up to speeds of up to 320 km/hour, and also designing and commissioning traction substations, switching substations, distribution systems, associated buildings, and training institute equipment for the entire corridor and 3 depots located in Thane, Surat and Sabarmati.

On 19 April, NHSRCL completed 300 km of pier work on the bullet train corridor.

As of July 2024, work began on the 7 km undersea tunnel section across Thane Creek and 194 km of viaduct construction had been completed.

=== 2025 ===
On 20 May 2025, it was reported that the Mumbai-Ahmedabad bullet train project had achieved a significant milestone with the completion of 300 kilometres of viaducts. This progress was marked by the successful launch of a 40-meter full-span box girder near Surat, Gujarat, as reported by the National High-Speed Rail Corporation Limited (NHSRCL). The project utilises advanced construction techniques, notably the Full Span Launching Method (FSLM), which accelerates construction up to ten times faster than traditional methods. A total of 6,455 full-span and 925 span units have been employed in building the viaducts. Complementing these efforts are dedicated casting yards and workshops across India, contributing to the infrastructure. Beyond the viaducts, substantial work is underway on foundations, pier construction, and girder casting. The physical progress according to the monthly project monitoring flash report of the Ministry of Statistics and Programme Implementation (MoSPI) for November 2025 was 56%.

=== 2026 ===
In January 2026, Railway Minister Ashwini Vaishnaw announced that the first operational section of the Mumbai–Ahmedabad high-speed rail corridor would be the Surat–Bilimora section, targeted to open on 15 August 2027, followed by the Vapi–Surat section and subsequent extensions towards Ahmedabad and Mumbai.

In March 2026, the project's estimated cost was reported to have risen by 83%, from approximately ₹1.08 lakh crore to ₹1.98 lakh crore, with the increase attributed largely to delays in land acquisition and consequent increases in land costs. Additional funding was expected to be provided by the Indian government rather than through a further Japanese loan. The project also faced delays in obtaining tunnel boring machines for the Mumbai tunnel, including the underwater section beneath Thane Creek.

By March, all 1,389.5 hectares required for the project had been acquired, all statutory clearances had been obtained and all 1,651 identified utilities had been shifted. Construction had reached 430 km of piers, 341 km of girders, 174 km of track bed and 153 km of overhead-electrification masts. In April, track installation using the Japanese Shinkansen-derived J-slab ballastless track system had progressed to 70 route-km of track slabs laid, with 185 route-km of reinforced-concrete track bed completed. In June, the breakthrough of a 417-metre mountain tunnel at Ambesari in Dahanu taluka, Palghar district, completed excavation of all three mountain tunnels between Boisar and Vapi; three mountain tunnels in Maharashtra had been excavated within five months. In July, Vaishnaw said that approximately 80% of the project work had been completed and reiterated that the Surat–Bilimora section would commence operations in 2027; the same month, overhead-electrification works using a 2×25 kV system were reported to be progressing along the corridor.

== See also ==
- B28 (trainset)
- High-speed rail in India
  - List of high-speed railway lines in India
  - Delhi–Ahmedabad high-speed rail corridor
  - Mumbai–Nagpur high-speed rail corridor
  - Mumbai–Hyderabad high-speed rail corridor
  - Ahmedabad-Dholera high-speed rail corridor
- Other
  - AC Superfast Express
  - Tejas Express
  - Uday Express
  - Vande Bharat Express
