= Sabarmati (area) =

- Neighbourhood
- Location in Ahmedabad, Gujarat, India Sabarmati (Gujarat) Sabarmati (India)
- Coordinates: 23.083680°N 72.588325°E
- Country: India
- State: Gujarat
- District: Ahmedabad

Government
  - Body: Ahmedabad Municipal Corporation

Languages
  - Official: Gujarati, Hindi
- Time zone: UTC+5:30 (IST)
- PIN: 380005
- Telephone code: 91-079
- Vehicle registration: GJ
- Lok Sabha constituency: Ahmedabad
- Civic agency: Ahmedabad Municipal Corporation
- Website: gujaratindia.com

Sabarmati is an area located in Ahmedabad, India. Sabarmati is located on the bank of the Sabarmati River. Sabarmati is a developed and rich area of western Ahmedabad. The main areas of Sabarmati are Ramnagar, Dharmnagar, Javaharchowk, Kabirchowk, Ranip, Kaligam, Motera, Janata Nagar, and Chandkheda.

== Transportation ==
The city is connected by rail through Sabarmati railway station. The nearest international airport is 10 km away.
