= Sadbhav Engineering =

Indian construction company

Sadbhav Engineering Limited
- Company type: Public
- Traded as: NSE: SADBHAV; BSE: 532710
- Industry: Infrastructure, Construction & Civil Engineering
- Founded: 3 October 1988; 37 years ago
- Founder: Vishnubhai M. Patel
- Headquarters: Ahmedabad, Gujarat, India
- Area served: India
- Key people: Shashin V. Patel (Chairman & MD); Vasistha C. Patel (CEO); Nitin R. Patel (CFO); Hardik J. Modi (Company Secretary)
- Revenue: ₹1,623.63 crore (US$170 million) (2021)
- Net income: ₹41.04 crore (US$4.3 million) (2021)
- Subsidiaries: Sadbhav Infra Projects (69.76%)
- Website: www.sadbhaveng.com

Sadbhav Engineering Limited (SEL) is an Indian civil engineering and construction company headquartered in Ahmedabad. Founded in 1988 by Vishnubhai M. Patel, the company has implemented projects in the construction of roads & highways, bridges, mining and irrigation-supporting infrastructure. The company worked for clients including NHAI, DMRC, Sardar Sarovar Narmada Nigam, Coal India, L&T, HCC, Punj Lloyd and various others.

Sadbhav Engineering is listed on Bombay Stock Exchange (BSE) and National Stock Exchange (NSE) since 2001. As of August 2021, the market capitalization of the company stood at ₹1,058 crore.

== Projects ==
Sadbhav Engineering, along with its subsidiary, Sadbhav Infrastructure Project Limited (SIPL) has executed some notable civil engineering as well as road and other infrastructure BOT projects:

- Ahmedabad-Dholera Expressway
- Eastern Peripheral Expressway (EPE)
- Yamunanagar Panchkula (Haryana)
- Mysore Bellary (Karnataka)
- Managuli to Devapura cross (Bijapur district and Yadagiri district )
- Delhi Metro Rail Corporation (DMRC)
- Sardar Sarovar Narmada Nigam Limited Canal Project
- Udaipur – Nathdwara Shrinath Ji tollway
- Jodhpur Ringroad
- Narmada River Main Canal
- Excavations for Vastan Mines of Gujarat Industries Power Corporation Limited (GIPCL)
- Sambalpur-Rourkela Road
- National Highway 8A from Samakhiyali to Bhachau in Gujarat
- National Highway 3 from Dhule to Madhya Pradesh
- Ranchi Ring Road
- National highway from Bhavnagar to Somnath

== See also ==
- Larsen & Toubro
- Punj Lloyd
