= Ahmedabad–Dholera Expressway =

Indian expressway connecting Ahmedabad and Bhavnagar

Ahmedabad–Dholera Expressway

Route information
- Maintained by National Highways Authority of India (NHAI)
- Length: 109 km (68 mi)
- Status: Operational
- Existed: 31 March 2026–present

Major junctions
- North end: Sarkhej, Ahmedabad
- South end: Adhelai, Bhavnagar

Location
- Country: India
- States: Gujarat
- Major cities: Ahmedabad and Bhavnagar

Highway system
- Roads in India; Expressways; National; State; Asian

Ahmedabad–Dholera Expressway (also known as NE 8) is a 109 km (68 mi) long, four-lane wide (expandable to eight) access-controlled expressway in Gujarat, India. It connects Sardar Patel Ring Road near Sarkhej in Ahmedabad with Adhelai village in Bhavnagar district via Dholera Special Investment Region (DSIR). The proposed Dholera International Airport near Navagam, about 20 km (12 mi) from Dholera SIR also lie in the route. The expressway was inaugurated by Prime Minister Narendra Modi on 31 March 2026.

The Ahmedabad–Dholera greenfield expressway is a part of the Delhi–Mumbai Industrial Corridor (DMIC).

== Construction ==
The NHAI has divided the construction work of Ahmedabad–Dholera Expressway into four packages. Its total construction cost (excluding the cost of land) is about ₹3,196 crores.

The list of contractors is as follows:

| Sr. No | Package | Length in km | Contractor |
|---|---|---|---|
| 1. | Sarkhej (Ahmedabad)–Sindhrej (Ahmedabad) | 22.0 | Sadbhav Engineering |
| 2. | Sindhrej (Ahmedabad)–Vejalaka (Ahmedabad) | 26.5 | Sadbhav Engineering |
| 3. | Vejalaka (Ahmedabad)–Dholera SIR (Ahmedabad) | 22.5 | GHV India |
| 4. | Dholera SIR (Ahmedabad)–Adhelai (Bhavnagar) | 38.0 | DRA Infracon |

== Status updates ==
- April 2020: Tenders floated for construction of expressway by the NHAI.
- August 2020: Tenders awarded in EPC mode to Sadbhav Engineering (Package 1 and 2), GHV India Pvt. Ltd. (Package 3) and Dineshchandra R. Agrawal Infracon Pvt. Ltd. (Package 4).
- April 2022: Work in progress

Feb 2026: opened for public testing
