= Kali, India =

Kaligam
- city
- Location in Gujarat, India Kaligam (India)
- Coordinates: 23.094669°N 72.572517°E
- Country: India
- State: Gujarat
- District: Ahmadabad

Population (2001)
  - Total: 34,223

Languages
  - Official: Gujarati, Hindi
- Time zone: UTC+5:30 (IST)
- Vehicle registration: GJ
- Website: gujaratindia.com

Kali is a city and a municipality in Ahmedabad district in the Indian state of Gujarat.

== Demographics ==
As of 2001 India census, Kali had a population of 34,223. Males constitute 53% of the population and females 47%. Kali has an average literacy rate of 82%, higher than the national average of 59.5%: male literacy is 86%, and female literacy is 77%. In Kali, 10% of the population is under 6 years of age.
