= Bandra Kurla Complex high-speed railway station =

Railway station in Maharashtra, India

General information
- Location: Bandra Kurla Complex, Mumbai, Maharashtra; India
- Coordinates: 19.0682°N 72.8659°E
- Elevation: 18 metres (59 ft)
- Operator: National High Speed Rail Corporation Limited
- Line: Mumbai–Ahmedabad HSR
- Platforms: 6
- Tracks: 6
- Connections: Line 3 Bandra Kurla Complex; Line 2B Income Tax Office (Under–construction)

Construction
- Structure type: Underground
- Parking: Yes

Other information
- Status: under-construction

History
- Opening: 2029
Route map
Key
- Source
Location
- Location within Maharashtra Location within India
- Interactive map

Bandra Kurla Complex high-speed railway station, also known as Mumbai BKC station, is an under-construction high-speed railway station on the Mumbai–Ahmedabad high-speed rail corridor. Located at Bandra Kurla Complex, Mumbai, Maharashtra, India, it is the only underground station on the Mumbai–Ahmedabad high-speed rail corridor and the southern terminus of the corridor. It is India's first underground bullet train station, located at a depth of approximately 32 metres (105 ft) below ground level, equivalent to a 10-storey standalone building. The station will have six platforms, each approximately 414 metres (1,358 ft) long, sufficient to accommodate425 m (1,394 ft) length for 16-coach E5 Series Shinkansen trains. The station is being constructed under Package C1 of the Mumbai–Ahmedabad high-speed rail corridor by a Joint Venture (JV) of Hyderabad-based Megha Engineering and Infrastructure Limited (MEIL) and Hindustan Construction Company Limited (HCC), contracted by the National High-Speed Rail Corporation Limited (NHSRCL).

== Construction ==
The National High-Speed Rail Corporation Limited (NHSRCL) had originally invited tenders for Package "C1" of the Mumbai-Ahmedabad high-speed rail corridor (MAHSR) in November 2019, but cancelled it in February 2022. Tenders were re-invited in July 2022, with a deadline of five years. The MEIL-HCC Joint Venture (JV), consisting of Hyderabad-based Megha Engineering and Infrastructure Limited (MEIL) and Hindustan Construction Company Limited (HCC), won the tender in December 2022. The NSHRCL signed an agreement with the MEIL-HCC JV for the design and construction of the high-speed railway station in March 2023. In September 2023, the JV began construction on the station after acquiring 4.8 hectares of land at the Bandra-Kurla Complex, with a completion deadline of 54 months. The station is slated to be completed by March 2028.

== Lines ==
The station will be served by the Mumbai–Ahmedabad high-speed rail corridor, and will be the first station as well as the southern terminus of the Mumbai–Ahmedabad high-speed rail corridor in Mumbai. It is also planned to be served as the western terminus of the Mumbai–Nagpur high-speed rail corridor.

== Structure ==
The station is planned as a multi-level underground structure approximately 32 32 m (105 ft) metres (105 ft) below ground level, equivalent to a 10-storey standalone building, supported by more than 3,300 secant piles, each extending 17–21 metres below ground level. Fourteen dedicated piling rigs are deployed for pile installation to manage the deep excavation in a dense urban environment. The station box is 467 metres (1,532 ft) long with a gross floor area of approximately 200,000 square metres (2,200,000 sq ft).

== Features ==
The station will have six platforms, each approximately 414 metres (1,358 ft) long, sufficient to accommodate a 16-coach E5 Series Shinkansen bullet train. Passenger amenities will include ticketing and waiting areas, a business-class lounge, nursery, restrooms, smoking rooms, information booths, retail centres, public information and announcement system. Two entry and exit points are planned: one connecting to the Mumbai Metro Line 2B station and another towards the MTNL building. Skylight provisions on the roof and ceilings are incorporated to allow natural lighting and reduce energy usage. The station is designed as a transport hub integrating with autos, buses, taxis, metro, and road transport.

== Connectivity ==
=== Road ===
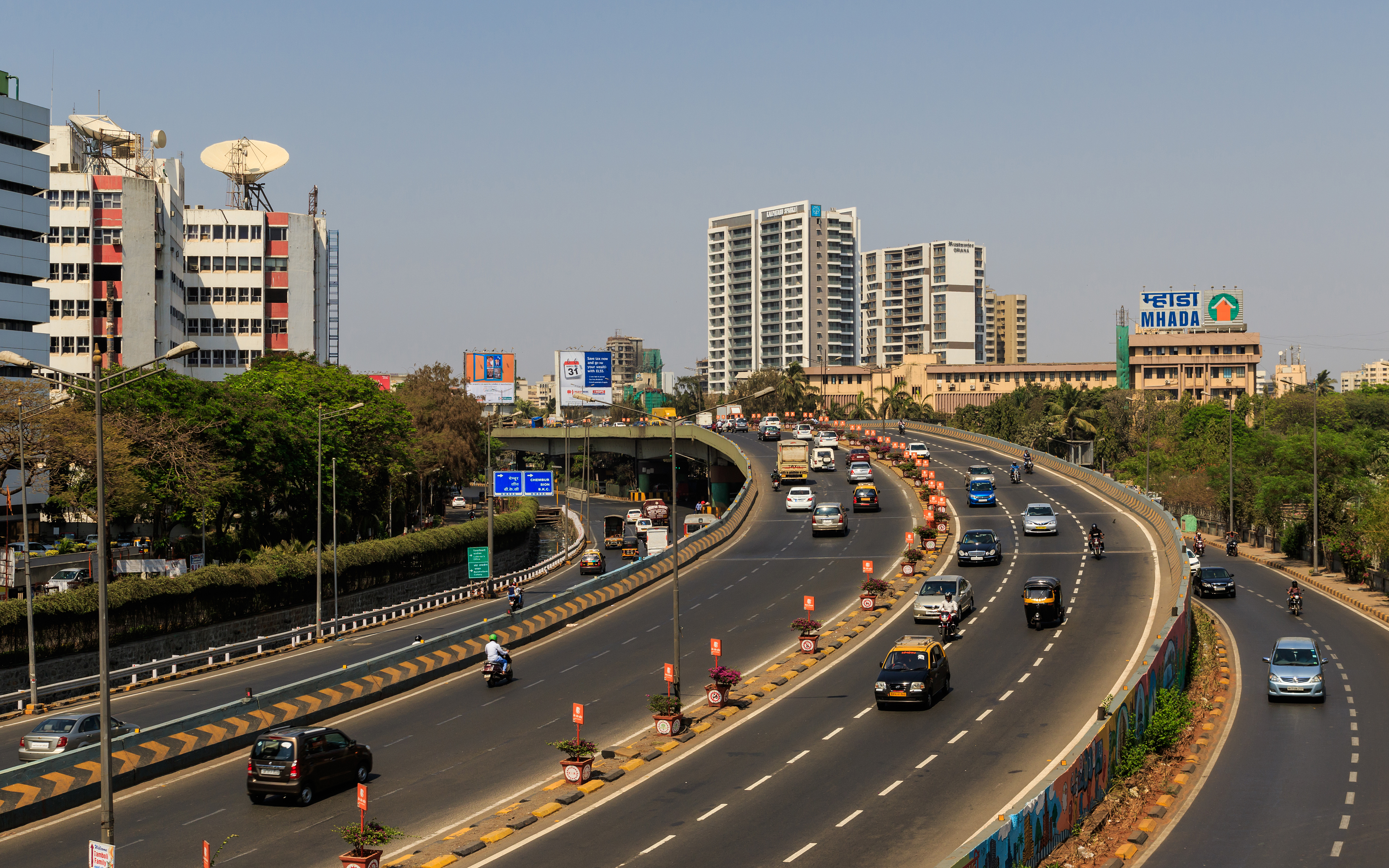
Western Express Highway

The station will be located along the Bandra Kurla Complex road, connecting the Western Express Highway located about 7 km (4.3 mi) away.

=== Rail ===
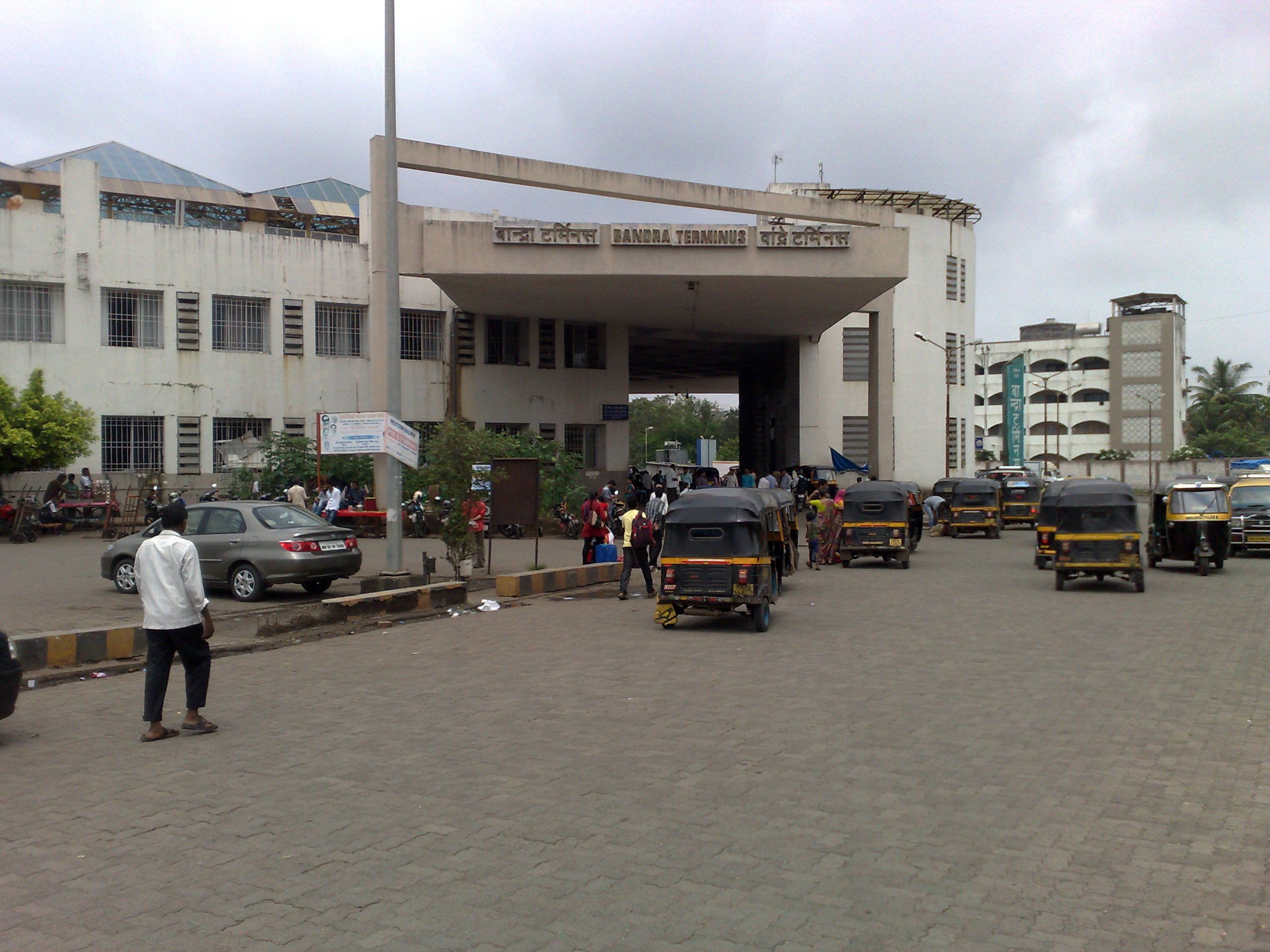
Bandra Terminus

The nearest Indian Railway stations after this station's completion will be Bandra Terminus, Bandra railway station and Khar Road railway station, all located within a range of 5 km (3.1 mi)-7 km (4.3 mi) away.

=== Metro ===
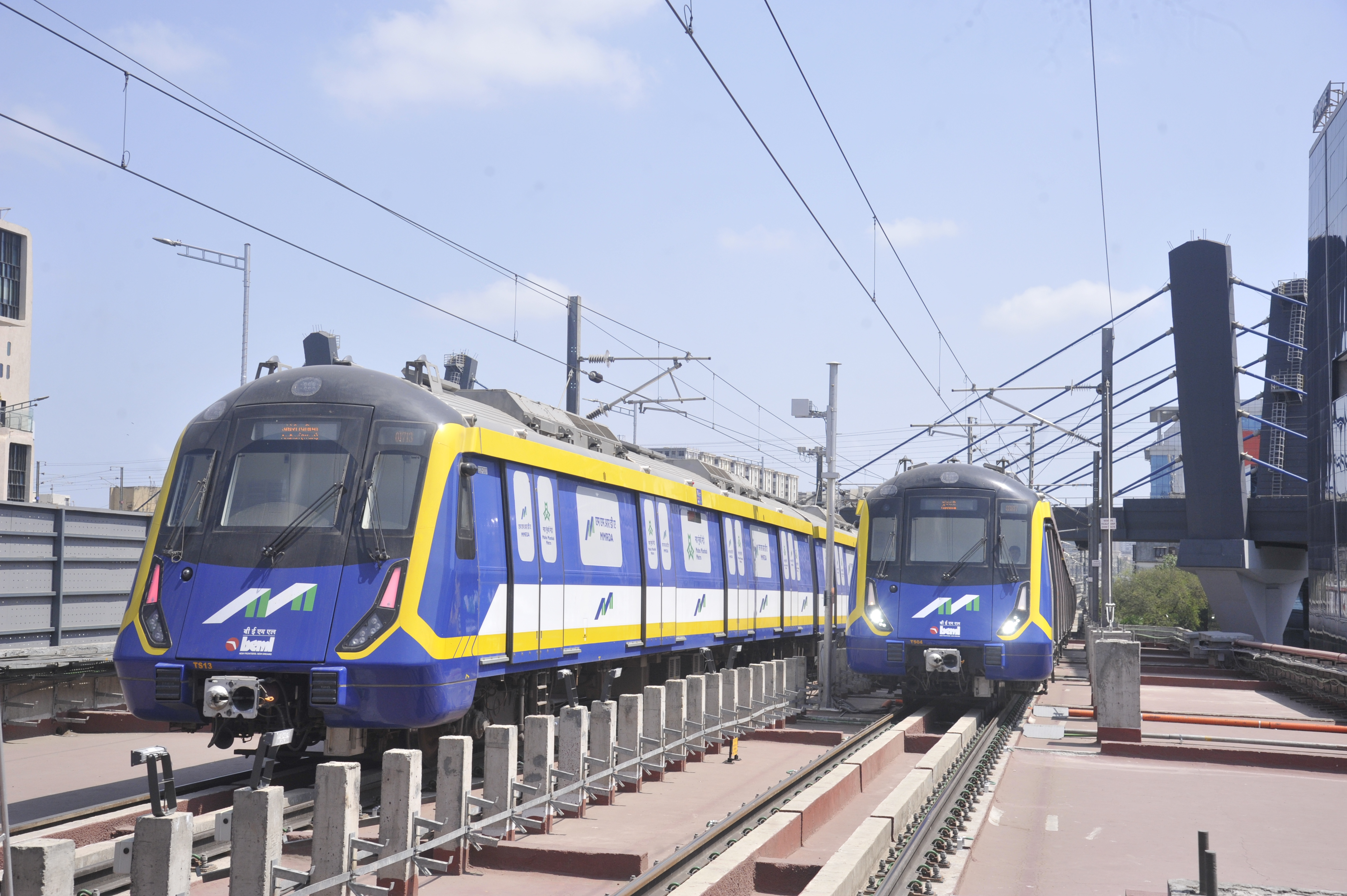
Trains of Line 2 (Yellow Line) of Mumbai Metro

The nearest metro stations after this station's completion will be Bandra, Income Tax Office, ILFS, BKC and MTNL metro stations of the Yellow and Aqua lines of Mumbai Metro, all of which are also under construction on the Bandra Kurla Complex road.

=== Air ===
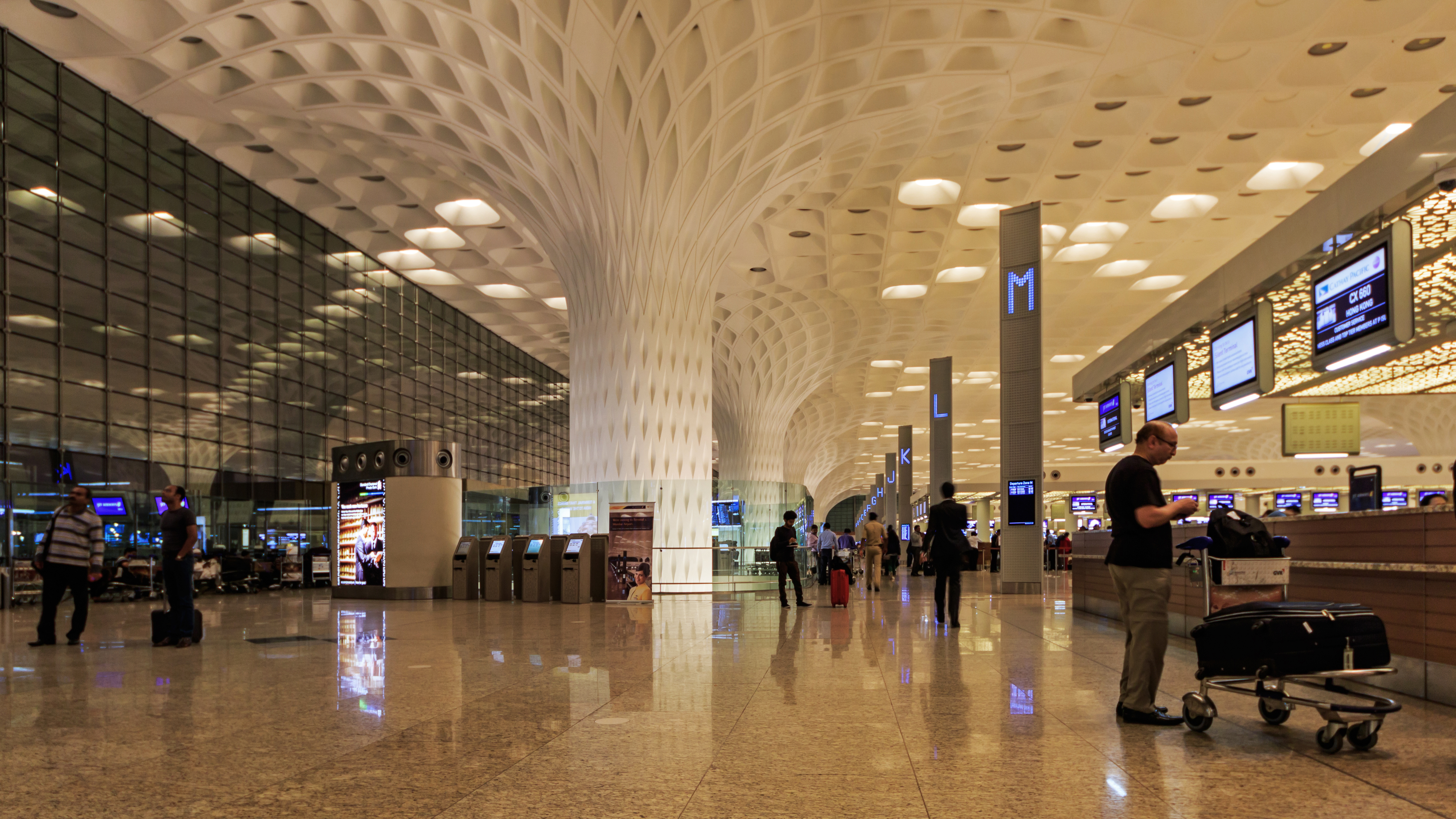
Chhatrapati Shivaji Maharaj International Airport

The station will be located only 10 km (6.2 mi) south from Chhatrapati Shivaji Maharaj International Airport after its completion.

== Ecological conservation efforts ==
During construction, to ensure safe execution of the deep excavation work, a comprehensive ground support system is being established to prevent soil erosion and degradation. This support system will have the installation of more than 3,300 secant piles, each to extend to a depth of 17–21 metres. The primary ongoing activity at the construction site is the installation of these secant piles, with 14 dedicated piling rigs actively engaged to make the piles.

== Future plans ==
After completion of the station, it was initially planned to make it a starting point as the western terminus of the proposed Mumbai-Hyderabad high-speed rail corridor, but the plan was shelved owing to lack of space and possible environmental impacts. So, that plan was changed to make a new station as the western terminus at the under-construction Navi Mumbai International Airport, and this plan was changed to make the BKC station as the western terminus for the Mumbai-Nagpur high-speed rail corridor, which is slated to be completed by 2032.

== See also ==
- High-speed rail in India
- Mumbai-Ahmedabad high-speed rail corridor
- Mumbai-Nagpur high-speed rail corridor
- Mumbai-Hyderabad high-speed rail corridor
- National High Speed Rail Corporation Limited
- Mumbai Metro
