= Rail Corridor =

Rail Corridor may refer to:

== Australia ==
- Melbourne–Adelaide rail corridor
- Sydney–Brisbane rail corridor
- Sydney–Melbourne rail corridor
- Sydney–Perth rail corridor

== Canada ==
- Island Rail Corridor
- Union Station Rail Corridor

== India ==
- Amritsar–Jammu high-speed rail corridor
- Chennai–Mysuru high-speed rail corridor
- Delhi–Ahmedabad high-speed rail corridor
- Delhi–Amritsar high-speed rail corridor
- Delhi–Kolkata high-speed rail corridor
- Delhi–Varanasi high-speed rail corridor
- Haryana Orbital Rail Corridor
- Hyderabad–Bengaluru high-speed rail corridor
- Mumbai–Ahmedabad high-speed rail corridor
- Mumbai–Hyderabad high-speed rail corridor
- Mumbai–Nagpur high-speed rail corridor
- Nagpur–Varanasi high-speed rail corridor
- Varanasi–Howrah high-speed rail corridor

== Singapore ==
- Rail Corridor, a former Keretapi Tanah Melayu (KTM) rail route from Woodlands to Tanjong Pagar in Singapore.

== United States ==
- Coachella Valley Rail
- Dumbarton Rail Corridor
- Eastside Rail Corridor
- Southeast High Speed Rail Corridor
- Southwest Rail Corridor
