= List of high-speed railway lines in India =

India currently does not have any high-speed rail lines operational, but has several lines planned, one of which is currently under construction. The following article lists all the lines in various stages of completion. For conventional lines in India, see List of railway lines in India.

Map showing proposed high speed corridors

== Classification ==
The Indian Ministry of Railways has classified railway line speeds into seven categories:

- Conventional lines: The routes which support an operational speed of less than 110 km/h (68 mph) are conventional rail lines.

- Group E lines: Support less than 100 km/h (62 mph)
- Group D lines: Support up to 100 km/h (62 mph)
- Group C lines: These lines are not categorised according to speed but rather comprise suburban railway lines, with speeds up to 130 km/h (81 mph) on some routes.

- Group B lines: The routes which support an operational speed between 110 and 130 km/h (68 and 81 mph) are classified as Group B lines.
- Group A lines: The routes that support the speeds between 130 and 160 km/h (81 and 99 mph) are classified as Group A lines.
- Semi-high-speed lines: The routes that support speeds between 160 and 200 km/h (99 and 124 mph) are considered as a higher speed or semi-high speed rail
- High-speed lines: The routes that support speeds beyond semi-high speeds are considered as high-speed lines.

== Overview ==
High-speed rail lines in India
Corridor	Speed	Length	Gauge	Status	Year	Ref.
Mumbai–Ahmedabad	320 km/h (200 mph)	508.18 km (315.77 mi)	Standard	Under Construction	2028	
Chennai–Bengaluru	320 km/h (200 mph)	306 km (190 mi)	Standard	Approved	2032	
Hyderabad–Bengaluru	320 km/h (200 mph)	618 km (384 mi)	Standard	Approved	2031	
Mumbai–Hyderabad	350 km/h (220 mph)	671 km (417 mi)	Standard	Approved	2031	
Delhi–Varanasi (with a spur from Lucknow to Ayodhya)	320 km/h (200 mph)	865 km (537 mi) + 135 km (84 mi) spur to Ayodhya	Standard	Approved	2031	
Varanasi–Siliguri	300–350 km/h (190–220 mph)	1,705 km (1,059 mi)	Standard	Approved	TBD	
Chennai–Hyderabad	350 km/h (220 mph)	744.57 km (462.65 mi)	Standard	Announced in Budget 2026–27, DPR under preparation	TBD	
Varanasi–Kolkata	320 km/h (200 mph)	711 km (442 mi)	Standard	DPR under preparation	2031	
Siliguri-Guwahati	320 km/h (200 mph)	850 km (530 mi)	Standard	Varanasi-Siliguri corridor announced in Budget 2026–27 overlapping this corridor	2031	
Delhi–Ahmedabad	320 km/h (200 mph)	886 km (551 mi)	Standard	Awaiting Approval	2031	
Pune–Nashik	200 km/h (125 mph)	235.15 km (146.12 mi)	Standard	Awaiting Approval	TBD	
Mumbai–Nagpur	320 km/h (200 mph)	736 km (457 mi)	Standard	Awaiting Approval	2051	
Thiruvananthapuram–Kannur	320 km/h (200 mph)	430 km (270 mi)	Standard	Awaiting Approval	TBD	
Delhi–Amritsar	320 km/h (200 mph)	480 km (300 mi)	Standard	DPR under preparation	2031	
Nagpur–Varanasi	320 km/h (200 mph)	855 km (531 mi)	Standard	Proposed	2032	
Amritsar–Jammu	320 km/h (200 mph)	190 km (120 mi)	Standard	Proposed	2032	
Ahmedabad–Rajkot	220 km/h (140 mph)	225 km (140 mi)	Standard	Proposed	TBD	

Operational semi-high-speed railway lines
Route	Speed	Length	Gauge	Type	Opened
Tughlakabad–Agra	160 km/h (99 mph)	174 km (108 mi)	Broad	Upgraded	2016
Sarai Khale Khan–Modipuram	160 km/h (99 mph)	55 km (34 mi)	Standard	New	2023

== 300–350 km/h ==
=== Mumbai–Ahmedabad ===
Mumbai–Ahmedabad high-speed rail corridor is the first of the twelve lines proposed and also the first one to be under construction, it connects India's economic hub Mumbai with the city of Ahmedabad. The 508.18 km (315.77 mi) stretch which is being developed with financial and technical support from Japan, when completed, will take about two hours to traverse, four hours quicker than regular rail which takes six hours and fifteen minutes.

=== Delhi–Ahmedabad ===
The Delhi-Ahmedabad corridor is part of the greater Delhi-Mumbai corridor and once completed, will connect Mumbai, the financial capital of India with New Delhi, the capital of India, and will bring down the travel time from existing twelve-hour journey on regular rail to three and a half hours. On 16 April 2024, the Detailed Project Report (DPR) for the 886 km (551 mi) corridor was approved by Indian Railways and as of April 2024, it is awaiting approval from the central government.

=== Delhi–Varanasi ===
The Delhi-Varanasi corridor of 813-kilometre (505 mi) length will connect Varanasi to Delhi through twelve stations via Lucknow. Depending on the cost feasibility, a spur route to Ayodhya may also be planned as a part of the network. The entire section is part of the greater Delhi-Kolkata corridor. Upon completion, it would take three and a half hours to reach Varanasi while existing fastest service of Vande Bharat takes eight hours. In 2022, the reports that stated shelving of the project was rejected by the central government by stating that it had no issues with the project report and alignment of the corridor.

=== Chennai–Bengaluru ===
The Chennai-Bengaluru is set to be southern India's first high-speed corridor, the 435 km (270 mi) corridor will cut the current six and a half hour journey down to just two hours and twenty-five minutes. As of March 2024, preliminary works involving route alignment and environmental impact assessment had been completed and Light Detection and Ranging (LiDAR) survey, alignment design, and balance activities were under way.

=== Mumbai–Nagpur ===
The 742 km (461 mi) long Mumbai-Nagpur corridor lies entirely within the state of Maharashtra. The DPR for the project was completed in 2022 and was submitted to the central government for approval. Most of the corridor is set to run along the Mumbai–Nagpur Expressway, thereby reducing the costs of land acquisition. Once completed, it will bring the travel time from the existing twelve hours to three and a half hours.

=== Mumbai–Hyderabad ===
The 711 km (442 mi) long corridor connecting Mumbai with Hyderabad, the capital of Telangana, has its DPR currently under preparation. There are plans for a Navi Mumbai terminal integrated with the under construction Navi Mumbai International Airport. However, the project has seen a setback after NHSRCL delayed the submission of DPR. When completed, the corridor is set to bring the current fifteen hours of travel time down to three and a half hours.

=== Varanasi–Howrah ===
The Varanasi-Howrah section is part of the greater Delhi-Howrah corridor connecting Delhi with Kolkata, the capital of West Bengal. The 711 km (442 mi) journey would take around three hours to complete, five hours quicker than existing Rajdhani service which takes ten hours. Indian Railways had prepared the DPR for seven more corridors, that included this section. However, as of June 2024, the DPR is yet to be approved by the government.

=== Hyderabad–Bengaluru ===
The Hyderabad-Bengaluru corridor is a proposed 618 km (384 mi) long corridor, connecting Hyderabad with Bengaluru, the capital of Karnataka. The existing fastest service of Vande Bharat Express between the cities takes around eight hours to complete, while the proposed high-speed service would take two and a half hours to complete, saving five and a half hours. The studies for soil testing, property, and land acquisition requirements are set to commence and culminate into the preparation of DPR.

=== Nagpur–Varanasi ===
The planned Nagpur-Varanasi corridor is 760 km (470 mi) long and the first one through Madhya Pradesh, linking Jabalpur with Nagpur and Varanasi. This corridor is among the seven other corridors where Indian Railways had initiated the preparations of DPR.

=== Delhi–Amritsar ===
The DPR for 459 km (285 mi) long Delhi-Amritsar corridor is currently under preparation. When completed it will take under two hours to reach Amritsar from New Delhi. After submissions of objections if any and approval, the land acquisition would commence under the RFCT LARR Act 2013.

=== Patna–Guwahati ===
The 850 km (530 mi) long proposed Patna-Guwahati corridor is the first corridor connecting Northeastern India. It will take around three and a half hours to complete the journey, eleven and a half hours quicker than existing fastest service of Rajdhani on the regular rail route.

=== Amritsar–Jammu ===
The 190 km (120 mi) long Amritsar-Jammu corridor is set to be Kashmir's first high-speed rail. The proposed corridor will connect Jammu to the Indian high-speed rail network via Pathankot.

=== Union Budget of 2026–27 ===
During the Union Budget of 2026–27, seven of these high-speed rail corridors were announced, namely: Mumbai–Pune, Pune–Hyderabad, Hyderabad–Bengaluru, Hyderabad–Chennai, Chennai–Bengaluru, Delhi–Varanasi and Varanasi–Siliguri.

== 200–250 km/h ==
=== Ahmedabad–Rajkot (220 km/h) ===
In 2021, the Railways had prepared and submitted the DPR of 225 km (140 mi) long Ahmedabad-Rajkot corridor connecting Gujrat's capital with one of its major city, Rajkot. But the project has been stalled for unknown reasons.

=== Thiruvananthapuram–Kasargod (200 km/h) ===
The 532 km (331 mi) Silver Line project connecting Kerala's Thrivananthapuram to Kasargod was proposed in 2019, but was temporarily halted in 2024 by the Kerala state government until central government's approval. The existing service of Vande Bharat takes about eight hours, while the Silver Line is slated to cut the journey time by half to four hours. A week after the railway ministry had shown doubts if the state government had abandoned the project, Kerala wrote a letter to the central government seeking approval in February 2024.

=== Pune–Nashik (200 km/h) ===
The Pune-Nashik high-speed rail project was initially 235 km (146 mi) in length, but after the addition of a stop in Shirdi, the length was further increased by 33 km (21 mi), making it a stretch of 268 km (167 mi). Upon completion this distance would be traversed in two and a half hours. The progress was stalled after an update in the alignment and it is currently awaiting for an approval from Cabinet Committee of Economic Affairs (CCEA).

== Semi-high-speed lines ==
=== Tughlakabad–Agra (160 km/h) ===
On 4 July 2014, Indian Railways conducted a trial run of a passenger train on the upgraded broad-gauge section between New-Delhi and Agra at speeds of 160 km/h (99 mph) along half of the 200 km (120 mi) long route. Following which Gatimaan Express was launched two years later in 2016 attaining the maximum speed on 174 km (108 mi) of the route between Tughlakabad and Agra Cantonment stations in Delhi and Agra respectively.

=== Sahibabad–Meerut south (160 km/h) ===
The new standard gauge railway between New Delhi and Meerut was envisioned under RapidX project to connect Delhi with its satellite cities. In 2023, a priority section of the line between Sahibabad and Duhai was opened, with the operations extending up to Meerut south in 2024. The service is operated at a maximum speed of 160 km/h on the existing 55 km (34 mi) section of the line.

== Diamond quadrilateral ==
Potential Diamond Quadrilateral route map.

Diamond quadrilateral is an ambitious plan from India to connect its major cities of Delhi, Bengaluru, Mumbai, Kolkata and Chennai via a high-speed rail network. Sections of this project are either already under construction or proposed.

Corridors under Diamond quadrilateral:

- Delhi–Mumbai: A section between Mumbai and Ahmedabad is under-construction, slated to open by 2028. extension to Delhi is planned.
- Delhi–Kolkata: Planned in two sections namely Delhi–Varanasi high-speed rail corridor and Varanasi–Kolkata high-speed rail corridor.
- Mumbai–Kolkata: A section between Mumbai and Nagpur is planned.
- Chennai–Kolkata: The section between Chennai and Amaravati is planned as a part of Chennai–Hyderabad high-speed rail corridor.
- Chennai–Mumbai: No plans as of 2025 for a direct corridor. May utilise planned Chennai–Hyderabad and Mumbai–Hyderabad corridors.
- Chennai–Delhi: No plans as of 2025.

== See also ==
- List of high-speed railway lines
- NHSRCL
- Dedicated freight corridors in India
- Future of rail transport in India
- Urban rail transit in India
