= Patna–Guwahati high-speed rail corridor =

Under-construction high-speed rail line

Siliguri–Guwahati High Speed Rail Corridor

Overview
- Status: Planned
- Owner: Indian Railways
- Locale: West Bengal; Assam
- Termini: Siliguri; Guwahati
- Stations: 10 (expected)
- Website: www.nhsrcl.in

Service
- Type: High-speed rail
- Operator(s): National High Speed Rail Corporation Limited
- Rolling stock: E5 Series Shinkansen

History
- Planned opening: 2051; 25 years' time

Technical
- Line length: 850 km (530 mi)
- Character: Elevated, underground and grade-separated
- Track gauge: 1,435 mm (4 ft 8 1/2 in) standard gauge
- Electrification: 25 kV AC, 50 Hz, overhead catenary
- Operating speed: 320 km/h (200 mph)

Siliguri–Guwahati High Speed Rail Corridor is one of the six new proposed high-speed rail lines that will run from West Bengal's Siliguri to Assam's largest city, Guwahati, via the Siliguri Corridor.

This line is set to boost the connectivity in Northeastern India by linking with the Delhi–Kolkata line.

== Possible stations ==
The route is according to the planned alignment as shown in National Rail Plan's (NRP) High-speed rail line map. As far as it is planned, the possible routes may be via Katihar & New Jalpaiguri with a 414-kilometre (257 mi) spur line to connect Howrah from Katihar. From Patna to Guwahati, Barauni, Khagaria, Naugachhia, Kishanganj, Cooch Behar, New Bongaigaon & Rangiya may be the stations en route. For Howrah connection line, Nabadwip Dham, Bolpur Rampurhat & Malda Town may be the stations en route.

== See also ==
- High-speed rail in India
  - Varanasi–Howrah high-speed rail corridor
  - Delhi–Varanasi high-speed rail corridor
