= Nagpur–Varanasi high-speed rail corridor =

Under-construction high-speed rail line

Nagpur–Varanasi High Speed Rail Corridor

Overview
- Status: Planned
- Owner: Indian Railways
- Locale: Maharashtra; Madhya Pradesh; Uttar Pradesh
- Termini: Nagpur; Varanasi
- Stations: 10 (expected)
- Website: www.nhsrcl.in

Service
- Type: High-speed rail
- Operator(s): National High Speed Rail Corporation Limited
- Rolling stock: E5 Series Shinkansen

History
- Planned opening: 2041; 16 years' time

Technical
- Line length: 760 km (470 mi)
- Character: Elevated, underground and grade-separated
- Track gauge: 1,435 mm (4 ft 8 1/2 in) standard gauge
- Electrification: 25 kV AC, 50 Hz, overhead catenary
- Operating speed: 320 km/h (200 mph)

The Nagpur–Varanasi High Speed Rail Corridor is one of the six new proposed high-speed rail lines that will connect Maharashtra's eastern city Nagpur to Uttar Pradesh's Varanasi.

This line will link with the Delhi–Kolkata line, hence connecting Mumbai with the eastern India.

== Possible stations ==
The stations are on the planned alignment as shown on National Rail Plan's (NRP) High-speed rail line map.

== Project status ==
=== 2021 ===
- December: Ministry of Railways had planned to propose four new high-speed rail corridors in India, including a 855 km corriodor from Nagpur to Varanasi.

== See also ==
- High-speed rail in India
  - Mumbai–Nagpur high-speed rail corridor
  - Delhi–Varanasi high-speed rail corridor
  - Varanasi–Howrah high-speed rail corridor
  - Patna–Guwahati high-speed rail corridor
