= Chennai–Hyderabad high-speed rail corridor =

Planned high-speed rail line

Chennai–Hyderabad High-speed Rail Corridor

Overview
- Other name: HCHSR
- Status: DPR Prepared, To be approved by govt.
- Owner: Indian Railways
- Locale: Tamil Nadu; Andhra Pradesh; Telangana
- Termini: Chennai; Hyderabad
- Stations: 18
- Website: www.nhsrcl.in

Service
- Type: High-speed rail
- Operator: National High Speed Rail Corporation Limited
- Rolling stock: TBD

History
- Planned opening: TBD

Technical
- Line length: 744.57 km (462.65 mi)
- Character: Elevated, underground, and grade-separated
- Track gauge: 1,435 mm (4 ft 8 1/2 in) standard gauge
- Electrification: 25 kV AC, 50 Hz, overhead catenary
- Operating speed: 350 km/h (220 mph)

The Chennai–Hyderabad High Speed Rail Corridor is a planned high-speed rail line connecting the capital of Tamil Nadu, Chennai with the capital Telangana, Hyderabad via the capital of Andhra Pradesh, Amaravati. When completed, it will be one of key links in India's high-speed rail line network along the east coast. Set to be the third high-speed rail line project of India involving Hyderabad, it will reduce the travel time between the cities of Chennai and Hyderabad from existing 12 hours to around 2.5 hours.

The corridor via Amaravati was first proposed by the Chief Minister of Andhra Pradesh N. Chandrababu Naidu in October 2024, requesting the union government to provide a high-speed rail connectivity between the southern economic hubs of Chennai, Bengaluru, Hyderabad and Amaravati, with the works stated to commence in 2026 post approval.

== Stations ==
Planned stations -

Order	Station Name	Notes
1	Chennai	
2	Chennai Ring Road	
3	Tirupati Airport	
4	Gudur	
5	Nellore	
6	Kavali	
7	Ongole	
8	Chirala	
9	Guntur	
10	Amaravati	
11	Dachepalle	
12	Wadapalli	
13	Haliya	
14	Dry Port	
15	Bharat City	
16	Rajiv Gandhi International Airport	
17	Hyderabad	

== Extensions ==
The corridor's section from Chennai to Amaravati is a part of the Chennai–Kolkata high-speed rail corridor, part of the bigger Diamond Quadrilateral, India's ambitious project aiming to connect all four major cities of Delhi, Mumbai, Chennai and Kolkata with High-speed rail.

== See also ==
- High-speed rail in India
- List of high-speed railway lines in India
- Hyderabad–Bengaluru high-speed rail corridor
- Chennai–Bengaluru high-speed rail corridor
- Mumbai–Hyderabad high-speed rail corridor
