= Varanasi–Siliguri high-speed rail corridor =

Railway line in India

Varanasi–Siliguri High Speed Rail Corridor is a proposed high-speed rail line connecting Eastern Uttar Pradesh with the gateway to Northeast India, Siliguri, via Bihar. It is proposed to start at the temple city of Varanasi in Eastern UP and pass through the capital of Bihar in Patna and end at Siliguri. The proposed line is set to connect Varanasi with Siliguri in 2 Hours 55 Minutes and connect with the Varanasi-Delhi High-Speed Railway at Delhi, providing seamless connectivity to the national capital. The line was announced in the 2026 national budget and is among the 5 other lines proposed in 2026.

== Station ==
The line starts from Varanasi in Uttar Pradesh and has stops in the states of Bihar and West Bengal. The stations are as follows:

=== Uttar Pradesh ===
- Varanasi
- Ghazipur

=== Bihar ===
- Buxar
- Araah
- Patna
- Bakhtiarput
- Begusarai
- Munger
- Bhagalpur
- Katihar
- Purnea
- Kishanganj

=== West Bengal ===
- Siliguri

== See Also ==
- High Speed Rail in India
  - Mumbai-Ahmedabad High-Speed Rail
  - Delhi-Varanasi High-Speed Rail
  - Varanasi-Howrah High-Speed Rail
