= High-speed rail in India =

As of 2026, India has no operational high-speed rail lines capable of supporting more than 200 km/h (125 mph). Currently, the highest speed is achieved by the Bhopal Shatabdi Express, Gatiman Express, Bhopal Vande Bharat Express and Khajuraho Vande Bharat Express on the Tughlakabad–Agra section and the regional Namo Bharat services with peak operational speed of 160 km/h (100 mph).

Indian Railways operates India's railway system and comes under the purview of the Ministry of Railways. As of 2023, it maintains over 108,706 km (67,547 mi) of tracks and operates over 13,000 trains daily. According to the Ministry of Railways, a route capable of supporting trains operating at 160 km/h (100 mph) or more is considered as a higher speed or semi-high speed rail line.

Earlier steam locomotive operated trains largely operated below 100 km/h (62 mph). With the introduction of electric locomotives in the later 1920s and newer steam locomotives, speeds of 100 km/h (62 mph) were achieved. With the movement to AC traction in the late 1950s and introduction of diesel locomotives, commercial speeds of up to 120 km/h (75 mph) was achieved in the late 1960s. With the introduction of high power electric locomotives in the 1990s, operating speeds of 130 km/h (81 mph) was achieved with further developments leading to maximum speeds of 160 km/h (100 mph) being realised in the early 2010s. Vande Bharat, an electric multiple unit (EMU), introduced in 2018, is the fastest operational train-set and is capable of reaching 183 km/h (114 mph).

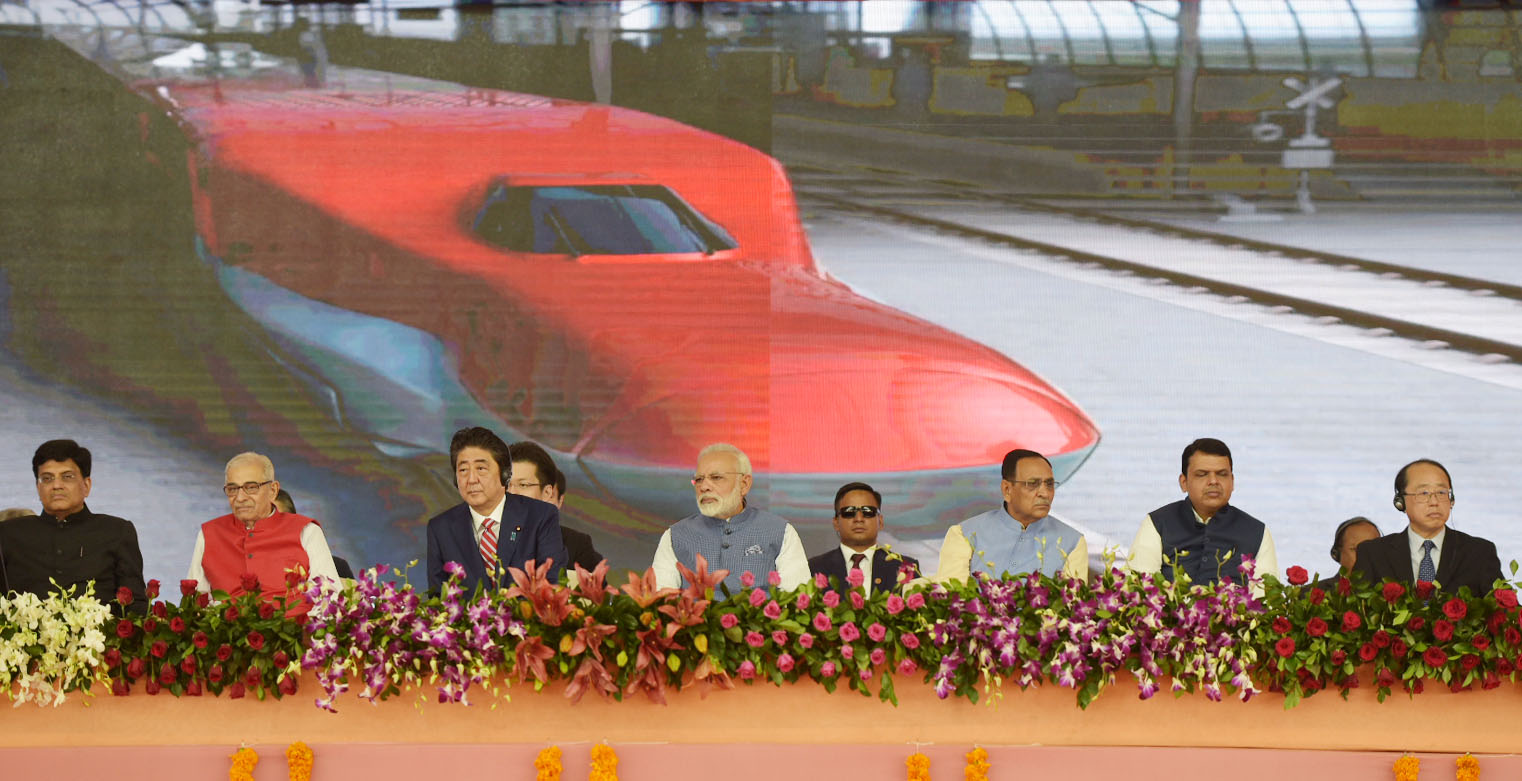
Prime ministers of India and Japan at ground breaking ceremony of Mumbai-Ahmedabad high-speed line on 14 September 2017. A Modified E5 series Shinkansen, that was originally agreed to be purchased by India, can be seen in the backdrop.

The first high-speed railway corridor between Mumbai and Ahmedabad of about 508 km (316 mi) is currently under construction with a designed maximum operational speed of 350 km/h (220 mph) and is expected to be operational fully by 2028-29. As of 2023, eight such corridors have also been proposed.

== History ==
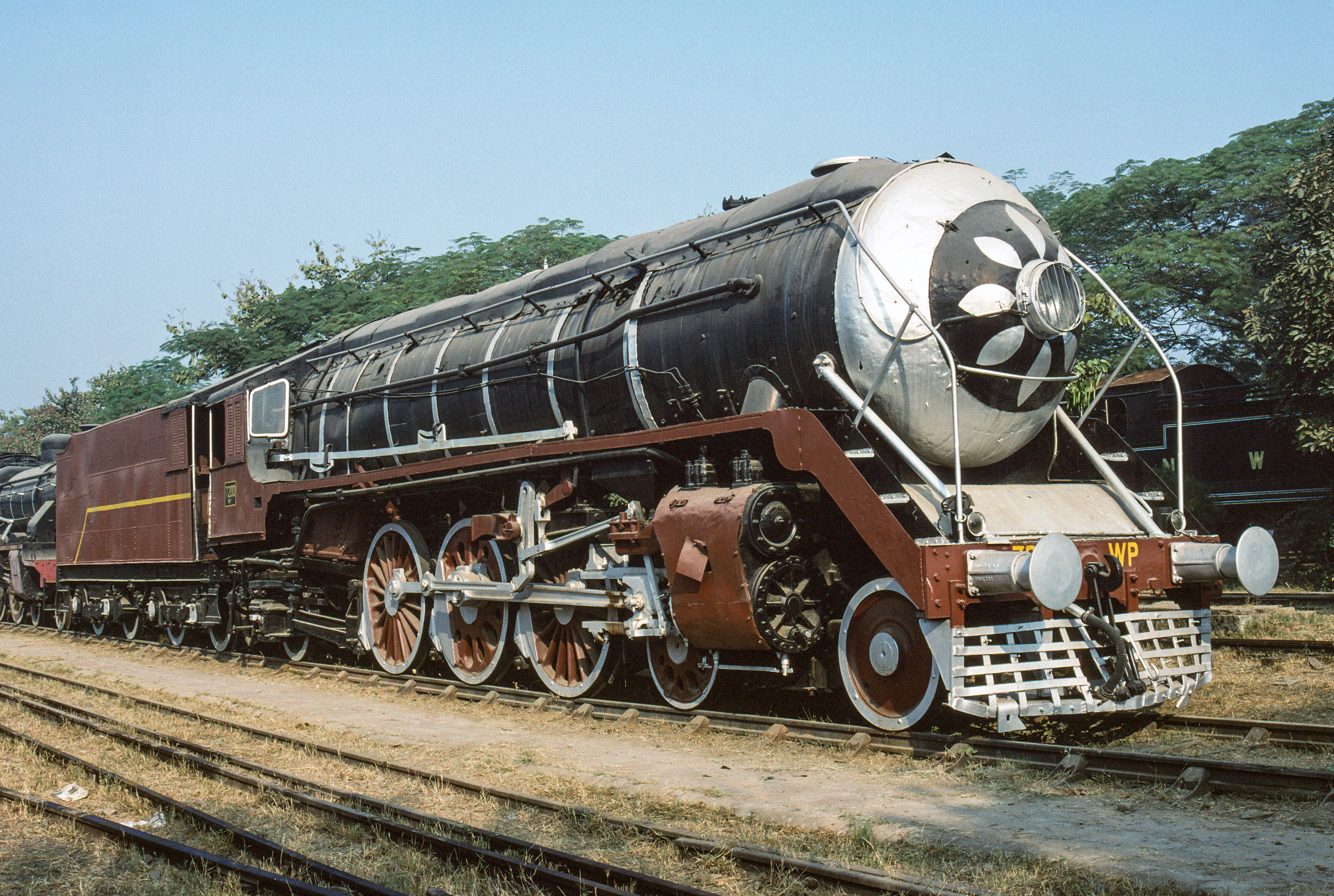
WP class steam locomotives reached speeds of 100 km/h (62 mph) in 1947

The history of the Indian Railway began in 1832 with the proposal to construct the first railway line in India at Madras. In 1837, the first train ran on Red Hill railway line between Red Hills and Chintadripet in Madras and was hauled by a rotary steam engine imported from England. In 1853, the first passenger train ran between Bombay and Thane which covered a distance of 54 km (34 mi) in 57 minutes, averaging a speed of 57 km/h (35 mph). Earlier trains ran using steam locomotives, where barely reached speeds of 90 km/h (56 mph). With the introduction of WP class locomotives in 1947, speeds of 100 km/h (62 mph) were operated commercially. While the first electric train ran in Bombay in 1925 on DC traction, WCP-1 class electric locomotives were introduced in 1928, capable of speeds of up to 137 km/h (85 mph), though trains operated at lower speed. WDM-1, the first diesel locomotive introduced in 1957 was capable of speeds of up to 104 km/h (65 mph). In 1957, Indian Railways adopted 25 kV 50 Hz AC traction with the first runs beginning in December 1959 with the WAM-1 locomotives, capable of reaching speeds of up to 112 km/h (70 mph).

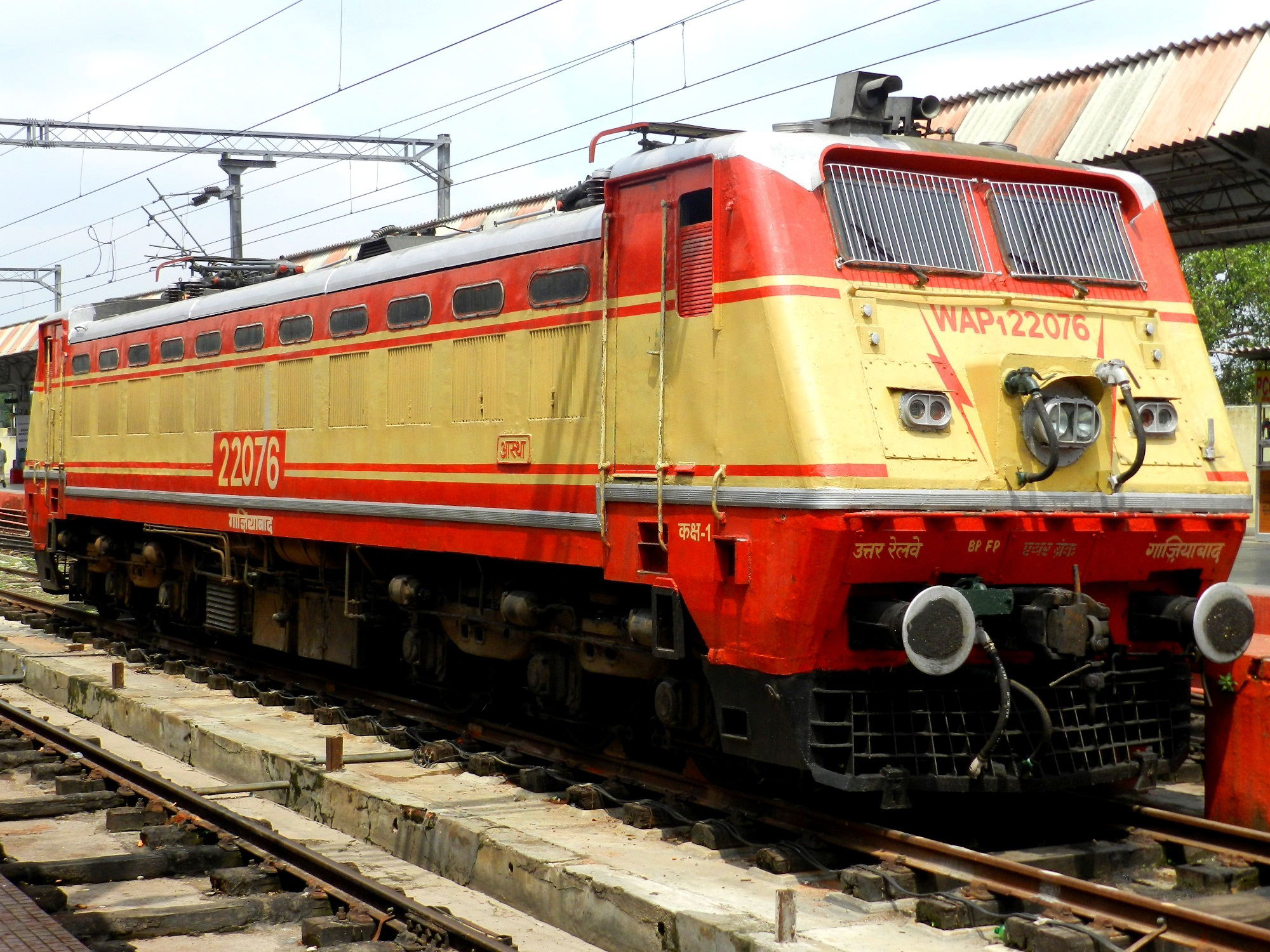
WAP-1 electric locomotives reached a speed of 130 km/h (81 mph) in 1980

In 1960, the Railway Board of India commissioned a study to increase the speed of its trains, which was restricted to 96 km/h (60 mph) on the existent broad gauge lines. A target of 160 km/h (100 mph) with an intermediate stage of 120 km/h (75 mph) was set for passenger trains. Research Design and Standards Organisation (RDSO) started work on the same in 1962 with field trials commencing in 1967. The coaches were manufactured by the Integral Coach Factory at Madras and hauled by diesel locomotives. On 19 February 1969, the Government of India announced the introduction of a new express train capable of reaching speeds of up to 120 km/h (75 mph) in the railway budget. On 1 March 1969, the first Rajdhani Express was flagged off from New Delhi to Howrah, which reached a maximum speed of 120 km/h (75 mph) and completed the 1,450 km (900 mi) trip in 17 hours 20 minutes at an average speed of 84 km/h (52 mph).

In 1980, the WAP-1 electric locomotives reached a speed of 130 km/h (81 mph). Shatabdi Express introduced in 1988, were capable of running at a maximum speed of 130 km/h (81 mph). WAP-5 class locomotives, initially imported from ABB in 1995 and later manufactured at Chittaranjan Locomotive Works in India, reached 184 km/h (114 mph) in trials. The locomotive later set an Indian speed record by hauling a train between Delhi and Agra at a speed of 160 km/h (100 mph) in 2014. In December 2009, the Ministry of Railways of Government of India envisaged the implementation of regional high-speed rail projects to provide services at 250–350 km/h (160–220 mph), and planning for corridors connecting commercial, tourist, and pilgrimage hubs. On 25 July 2013, Government of India established the High Speed Rail Corporation under Rail Vikas Nigam (RVNL) for the implementation of high-speed rail corridor projects. In 2014, the Diamond Quadrilateral high speed rail project, which would connect the cities of Chennai, Delhi, Kolkata and Mumbai via high-speed rail was approved by the government.

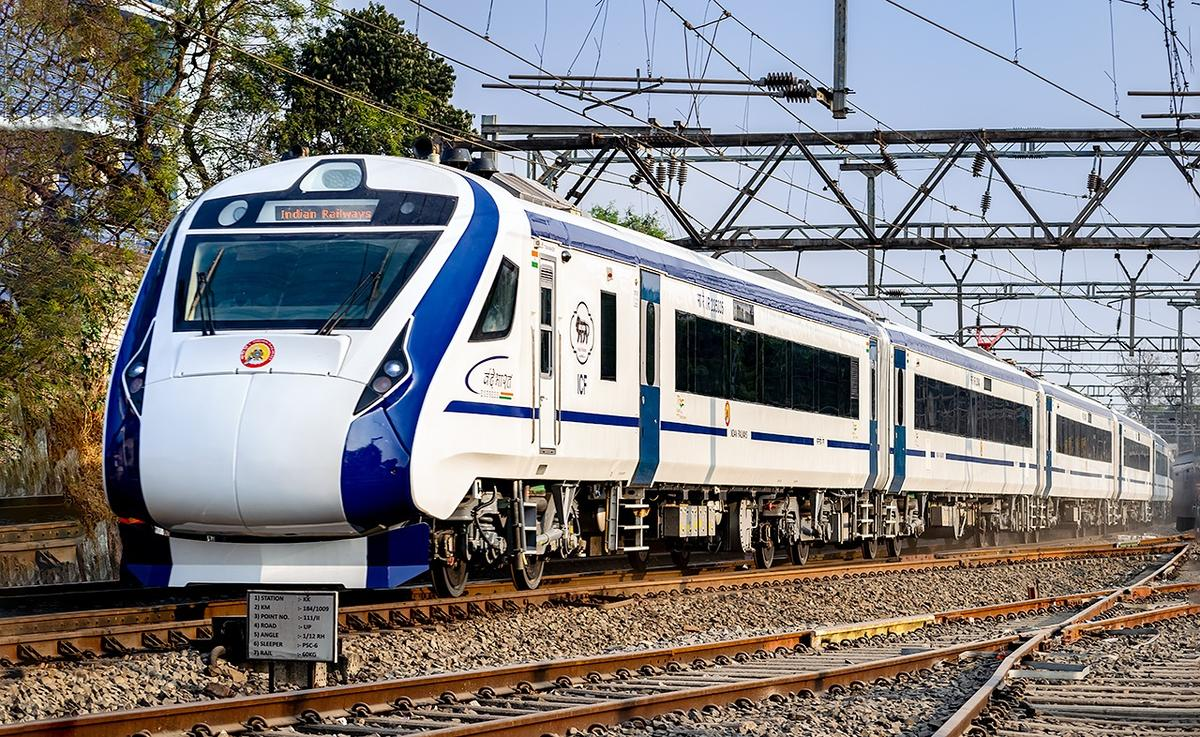
Introduced in 2019, Vande Bharat train-set built by ICF, is the fastest in India

In April 2016, the WAP-5 hauled Gatimaan Express became the fastest commercial train in India, with a maximum operational speed of 160 km/h (100 mph). In 2018, a modified WAP-5A locomotive, capable of speeds up to 200 km/h (125 mph) was rolled out. HSRC was renamed as National High Speed Rail Corporation (NHSRC) in 2016. NHSRC identified eight corridors for the development of high speed railway. Construction of the Mumbai–Ahmedabad high-speed rail corridor, India's first high-speed rail corridor started in 2021 and is expected to be operational by 2028.

In 2018, Integral Coach Factory in Chennai, rolled out a semi-high-speed EMU train-set, capable of reaching 180 km/h (112 mph). In 2019, the first Vande Bharat Express entered commercial service with a maximum operational speed of 160 km/h (100 mph). The actual operating speed was much lower due to track restrictions and congestion with top speeds restricted to 130 km/h (81 mph) for most trains. In October 2023, Namo Bharat, built for RapidX by Alstom was launched and is capable of reaching speeds of up to 180 km/h (112 mph). In December 2023, two modified WAP-5 locomotives were used to haul the Amrit Bharat train-set in a push-pull configuration, capable of reaching speeds of up to 160 km/h (100 mph).

In June 2024, the Indian Government announced that rather than purchase the now legacy E5 Series Shinkansen sets, contracted, in 2016, for the Mumbai-Ahmedabad High-Speed Rail corridor, its own, government owned, Integral Coach Factory and BEML, would produce a pair of standard gauge trains, capable of a maximum operational speed of 250 km/h (160 mph), for the line. The first prototype is expected to be delivered in December 2026.

In April 2025, it was reported that Japan will gift India two retired engineering train sets, one, 2011, E5 - (Doctor Yellow), and the, 2001, E3 - Class E926 Shinkansen, to help test and inspect the under-construction Mumbai-Ahmedabad High-Speed Rail corridor. The two train sets are to be delivered in 2026, to aid the 2027-2028 commissioning of the line. The gifted Doctor Yellow will have a maximum operational speed of 285 km/h (177 mph). It was also reported that the Indian Government has a desire to purchase E10 Series Shinkansen for the corridor.

== Definition ==
According to the Ministry of Railways, a route where train can operate between 160–200 km/h (100–125 mph) is considered as a higher speed or semi-high speed rail line, while the routes operating at less than 160 km/h (100 mph) are considered to be conventional rail lines. According to the International Union of Railways (IUC), a commercial speed of over 250 km/h (155 mph) for a newly built line or 200 km/h (125 mph) for an upgraded line is considered to be high-speed.

As of 8 April 2024
Under Construction

Classification
Speed	Type	Length
>200 km/h (125 mph)	High-speed	508 km (316 mi)
160–200 km/h (100–125 mph)	Semi-high-speed	229 km (142 mi)
130–160 km/h (80–100 mph)	Group A	67,869 km (42,172 mi)
110–130 km/h (70–80 mph)	Group B	67,869 km (42,172 mi)
<110 km/h (70 mph)	Group C/D/E	67,869 km (42,172 mi)

== Network and infrastructure ==
=== High-speed rail ===
Map showing under construction and proposed high speed corridors

As of 2026, India does not have any operational high-speed tracks. In 2016, Ministry of Railways envisaged to have top speeds of 300–350 km/h (190–220 mph) with trains running on elevated corridors to isolate high-speed train tracks to prevent trespassing. Multiple feasibility studies have been done and probable routes have been identified. In 2017, a 508 km (316 mi) standard gauge line between Mumbai and Ahmedabad was approved for construction and is expected to be operational by 2028.

In the Union Budget of 2026–27, the Government of India officially approved a ₹16 lakh crore (approximately $192 billion USD) blueprint to build seven new high-speed rail corridors. The planned network has a total length of approximately 4,000 kilometres and is developed under the National High-Speed Rail Corporation Limited (NHSRCL). Due to the strategic standardization of construction methods, signaling systems, and rolling stock production, the government has accelerated the execution pipeline, targeting operational readiness across the corridors by 2031. This high-speed rail grid is designed to connect major regional and economic hubs, covering the routes of Mumbai–Pune, Pune–Hyderabad, Hyderabad–Bengaluru, Hyderabad–Chennai, Chennai–Bengaluru, Delhi–Varanasi, and Varanasi–Siliguri.

High-speed rail lines in India
Corridor	Speed	Length	Gauge	Status	Year	Ref.
Mumbai–Ahmedabad	320 km/h (200 mph)	508.18 km (315.77 mi)	Standard	Under Construction	2028	
Chennai–Bengaluru	320 km/h (200 mph)	306 km (190 mi)	Standard	Approved	2032	
Hyderabad–Bengaluru	320 km/h (200 mph)	618 km (384 mi)	Standard	Approved	2031	
Mumbai–Hyderabad	350 km/h (220 mph)	671 km (417 mi)	Standard	Approved	2031	
Delhi–Varanasi (with a spur from Lucknow to Ayodhya)	320 km/h (200 mph)	865 km (537 mi) + 135 km (84 mi) spur to Ayodhya	Standard	Approved	2031	
Varanasi–Siliguri	300–350 km/h (190–220 mph)	1,705 km (1,059 mi)	Standard	Approved	TBD	
Chennai–Hyderabad	350 km/h (220 mph)	744.57 km (462.65 mi)	Standard	Announced in Budget 2026–27, DPR under preparation	TBD	
Varanasi–Kolkata	320 km/h (200 mph)	711 km (442 mi)	Standard	DPR under preparation	2031	
Siliguri-Guwahati	320 km/h (200 mph)	850 km (530 mi)	Standard	Varanasi-Siliguri corridor announced in Budget 2026–27 overlapping this corridor	2031	
Delhi–Ahmedabad	320 km/h (200 mph)	886 km (551 mi)	Standard	Awaiting Approval	2031	
Pune–Nashik	200 km/h (125 mph)	235.15 km (146.12 mi)	Standard	Awaiting Approval	TBD	
Mumbai–Nagpur	320 km/h (200 mph)	736 km (457 mi)	Standard	Awaiting Approval	2051	
Thiruvananthapuram–Kannur	320 km/h (200 mph)	430 km (270 mi)	Standard	Awaiting Approval	TBD	
Delhi–Amritsar	320 km/h (200 mph)	480 km (300 mi)	Standard	DPR under preparation	2031	
Nagpur–Varanasi	320 km/h (200 mph)	855 km (531 mi)	Standard	Proposed	2032	
Amritsar–Jammu	320 km/h (200 mph)	190 km (120 mi)	Standard	Proposed	2032	
Ahmedabad–Rajkot	220 km/h (140 mph)	225 km (140 mi)	Standard	Proposed	TBD	

Diamond Quadrilateral

Proposed routes for Diamond Quadrilateral

In 2014, the Diamond Quadrilateral high-speed rail network project was launched by Government of India and is envisioned to connect the four major metro cities of India namely: Chennai, Delhi, Kolkata and Mumbai.

Super high-speed rail

In 2016, Indian Railways explored the possibility of maglev trains to implement an over-500-kilometre-per-hour (310 mph) speed rail system. In February 2019, a train model based upon the same was unveiled by Raja Ramanna Centre for Advanced Technology capable of speeds of up to 600 km/h (370 mph). In September 2020, Bharat Heavy Electricals Limited signed a pact with SwissRapide AG for the implementation of MagLev metro systems in India.

While there are no operational hyperloop systems in the world, testing has been done and a few routes have been proposed. Hyperloop One submitted a detailed project report in January 2018 for Mumbai to Pune. Virgin Hyperloop signed a MoU with Government of Punjab in 2019 for building a rail to cover total 226 km (140 mi) distance between Amritsar and Chandigarh. Hyperloop One signed a MoU with Government of Karnataka to conduct a feasibility study on the Bengaluru-Chennai route in 2017. Zeleros proposed a vision for a hyperloop network in India by 2050, connecting main cities.

=== Semi-high speed rail ===
A 174 km (108 mi) segment of track in the Tughlakabad–Agra Cantonment section supports semi-high speeds of up to 160 km/h (100 mph). As of 2023, the maximum operational speed of 160 km/h (100 mph) is achieved by Gatimaan Express and Vande Bharat Express on the above section.

Track upgrades (Broad gauge)

In 2009, Indian Railways envisioned a plan to increase the speed of passenger trains to 160–200 km/h (100–125 mph) on dedicated conventional tracks and improve the existing conventional lines on 1,676 mm (5 ft 6 in) Broad gauge to handle speeds of up to 160 km/h (100 mph). Dedicated Freight Corridor Corporation of India has built dedicated freight corridors across India to divert cargo traffic from the passenger railway tracks, thus helping increase the operational speed of the passenger trains to 160 km/h (100 mph).

Broad gauge track upgrades
Route	Speed	Length	Year	Status	Reference
Tughlakabad–Agra	160 km/h (100 mph)	174 km (108 mi)	2016	Operational	
New Delhi–Mumbai	160 km/h (100 mph)	1,384 km (860 mi)	2030s	Under upgradation	
Ahmedabad–Mumbai	160 km/h (100 mph)	492 km (306 mi)	2030s	Under upgradation	
New Delhi–Howrah	160 km/h (100 mph)	1,446 km (899 mi)	2030s	Under upgradation	
Chennai–Gudur	160 km/h (100 mph)	134.3 km (83.5 mi)	TBD	DPR submitted	
Chennai–Renigunta	160 km/h (100 mph)	134.78 km (83.75 mi)	TBD	DPR submitted	
Mumbai–Howrah	160 km/h (100 mph)	1,965 km (1,221 mi)	TBD	DPR submitted	
Mumbai–Chennai	160 km/h (100 mph)	1,276 km (793 mi)	TBD	DPR submitted	
Chennai–Howrah	160 km/h (100 mph)	1,652 km (1,027 mi)	TBD	DPR submitted	
Bengaluru–Chennai	160 km/h (100 mph)	362 km (225 mi)	TBD	DPR submitted	
Chennai–New Delhi	160 km/h (100 mph)	2,164 km (1,345 mi)	TBD	DPR submitted	
Bengaluru–Hyderabad	160 km/h (100 mph)	632 km (393 mi)	TBD	DPR submitted	
Chennai–Hyderabad	160 km/h (100 mph)	715 km (444 mi)	TBD	DPR submitted	
Howrah–Puri	160 km/h (100 mph)	502 km (312 mi)	TBD	DPR submitted	
Thiruvananthapuram–Mangaluru	160 km/h (100 mph)	873 km (542 mi)	TBD	TBD	

New tracks

RapidX system operating on 1,435 mm (4 ft 8+1/2 in) Standard gauge tracks and capable of supporting speeds of up to 180 km/h (112 mph), became operational with the partial opening of Delhi–Meerut line in 2023.

New regional semi-high-speed tracks
Route	Speed	Length	Status	Reference
Delhi–Meerut	160 km/h (99 mph)	82 km (51 mi)	Operational	
Delhi–Alwar	180 km/h (112 mph)	164 km (102 mi)	Under construction	
Delhi–Panipat	180 km/h (112 mph)	103 km (64 mi)	Approved	
Delhi–Rohtak	180 km/h (112 mph)	70 km (43 mi)	Proposed	
Delhi–Palwal	180 km/h (112 mph)	60 km (37 mi)	Proposed	
Delhi–Baraut	180 km/h (112 mph)	54 km (34 mi)	Proposed	
Ghaziabad–Khurja	180 km/h (112 mph)	83 km (52 mi)	Proposed	
Ghaziabad–Hapur	180 km/h (112 mph)	57 km (35 mi)	Proposed	
Delhi–Jewar	180 km/h (112 mph)	67 km (42 mi)	Proposed	
Hyderabad–Warangal	180 km/h (112 mph)	146 km (91 mi)	Proposed	
Hyderabad–Vijayawada	180 km/h (112 mph)	281 km (175 mi)	Proposed	
Chengannur–Pamba (Sabarimala Temple)	200 km/h (124 mph)	59.23 km (36.80 mi)	DPR Submitted, Waiting for final approval	

=== Rolling stock ===
For high-speed rail, the Indian railways will construct bullet train assembly facilities on a public-private participation (PPP) model. As per NHSRCL, Japanese companies will set up manufacturing facilities in India to build the parts for bullet train sets. For semi-high speed rail, Indian Railways had already rolled out Train 18 in 2018. These self-propelled EMU train sets manufactured by Integral Coach Factory are capable of reaching 180 km/h (112 mph). These trains have eight or sixteen coaches with driver cabins on both ends, which eliminates the time needed for turnaround at the terminal station with faster acceleration and deceleration, enabling the train to travel at a top speed for longer distance.

Rolling stock
Name	Image	Origin	Manufacturer	Trainsets	Lines	Type	Gauge size	Gauge type	Traction	Max speed (km/h)		Status	Year
Name	Image	Origin	Manufacturer	Trainsets	Lines	Type	Gauge size	Gauge type	Traction	Potential	Operational	Status	Year
Semi-high-speed
Vande Bharat (Prototype)		India	ICF	2	1	EMU	1676mm	Broad-gauge	Electric	180	130	In service	2019
Vande Bharat		India	ICF	53	51	EMU	1676mm	Broad-gauge	Electric	180	160	In service	2022
Namo Bharat		India	Alstom	210	1	EMU	1435mm	Standard-gauge	Electric	180	160	In service	2023
High-speed
E5 Series Shinkansen		Japan	Hitachi Rail & Kawasaki	None (24 planned)	N/A	EMU	1435mm	Standard-gauge	Electric (25 kV 50 Hz AC)	320	N/A	Planned	2026

=== Construction ===
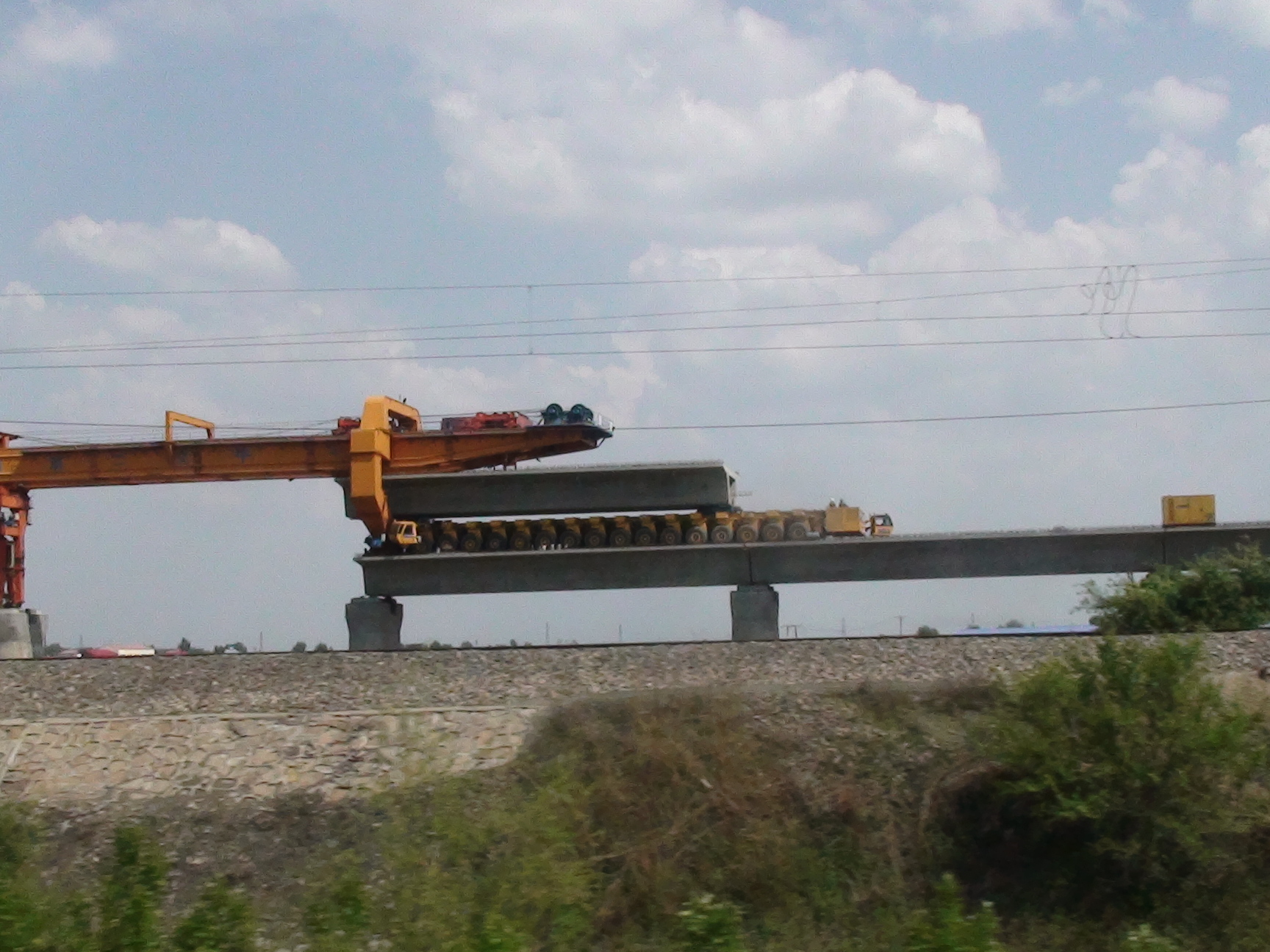
A prefabricated section of elevated track installed by a mega carrier and launcher in China in 2010

Mega carrier and launcher machines or transporter, gantry, and full span launcher machines are machines used to construct viaducts (elevated structures) for bullet train corridors in China. These vehicles carry an entire girder by traveling on already launched girders to place the next one. The speed was several times faster compared to India's conventional girder launching mechanism, with the Chinese machine laying two girders a day on an average compared to one and a half girders in a week by the Indian counterpart. NHSRCL then asked L&T which was constructing the 325 km (202 mi) stretch of Mumbai-Ahmedabad line to build such machines. The machine costs around ₹70 crore (US$7.5 million) and 30 such machines were required to construct the 465 km (289 mi) elevated stretch. On 9 September 2021, India joined four other countries, to possess Full Span Launching Methodology (FSLM) technology after L&T was able to develop the machine successfully. NHSRCL planned to acquire 20 such machines initially for the Mumbai-Ahmedabad high-speed rail project in order to speed up construction. These machines could be later deployed to build viaducts for elevated roads and rapid transit systems across India.

== Research ==
National Academy of Indian Railways, Vadodara was established in 2018 with the aim of developing indigenously high-speed train manufacturing technology. Other institutions focused on Railway technology research and development are: IIT BHU Malviya Centre for Railway Technology, IIT Kharagpur Centre for Railways Research and Research Design and Standards Organization (RDSO). Integral Coach Factory(ICF) Chennai has been tasked with producing steel body trains capable of 280kmph and in service speed of 250kmph for the bullet train routes.

== Records ==
Year	Class	Type	Speed	Image
1947	WP class	Steam	100 km/h (62 mph)	
1969	WDM-4	Diesel	120 km/h (75 mph)	
1971	WDM-4	Diesel	130 km/h (81 mph)	
1971	WAM-2/3	Electric	140 km/h (87 mph)	
1982	WAM-4B	Electric	145 km/h (90 mph)	
1988	WAP-1	Electric	160 km/h (99 mph)	
1996	WAP-4	Electric	169 km/h (105 mph)	
1997	WAP-5	Electric	184 km/h (114 mph)	

== See also ==
- B28 trainset – Upcoming Indian high speed train type
- Future of rail transport in India
- List of high-speed railway lines in India
- Urban rail transit in India
- List of high-speed railway lines
- High-speed railways
