= Chennai Parandur Airport =

Proposed airport in Chennai

Location in Tamil Nadu

Chennai Parandur Airport was a proposed greenfield airport project to serve the Chennai Metropolitan Area in the Indian state of Tamil Nadu. It was planned to be built near Parandur in Kanchipuram district, and would have served as the secondary airport alongside the existing Chennai International Airport. In June 2026, the Government of Tamil Nadu announced the cancellation of the project and planned to propose an alternative location for Chennai's second airport.

== History ==
Plans for a new greenfield airport for the Chennai Metropolitan Area was put forward as early as in 1998. In 2007, the Chief Minister of Tamil Nadu announced that the new airport would be set up in 4,820 acres (1,950 ha) land near Sriperumbudur. As the new airport was delayed due to land acquisition problems, an expansion plan was unveiled to expand the existing Chennai International Airport in 2018 to increase the terminal area to 160,000 m^{2} (1,700,000 sq ft) with a capacity of 35 million passengers. The existing airport is expected to reach saturation by 2035. The Government of Tamil Nadu initially proposed alternate locations such as Mamandur for the airport, but the project was not started.

In 2022, the state government announced renewed plans to build a new airport. The state government identified Padalam, Thiruporur, Pannur and Parandur as the possible sites for the airport. After a feasibility study, the Airports Authority of India shortlisted Parandur and Pannur as the sites for the proposed airport. In August 2022, the Government of Tamil Nadu selected Parandur in Kanchipuram district as location for the new airport on 4,970 acres (2,010 ha) of land. The planned airport would be spread over 13 villages, and surrounding farmlands. The proposed land acquisition for the airport led to protests by the local villagers due to the fear of loss of livelihood. By November 2025, the state government had acquired 1,100 acres (450 ha) of land spread across 17 villages and had distributed ₹6.8 billion (US$73 million) as compensation to the land owners.

In June 2026, the state government announced the cancellation of the project, citing that it would result in the destruction of water bodies and agricultural lands, and that it would identify an alternative location for Chennai's second airport. However, on 20 July 2026, the Ministry of Civil Aviation stated that the state government had not submitted any proposal seeking a change in the location of the proposed airport. Later, on 24 August 2026, the Tamil Nadu Chief Minister officially conveyed the government's decision to scrap the project to the Tamil Nadu Legislative Assembly. The Hindu reported the project as officially abandoned on 20th November 2026, with Advocate General Vijay Narayan stating that obtaining all environmental clearances would be hard to obtain due to the large number of wetlands in the area.

== Connectivity ==
In 2022, the state government proposed an extension for the planned Yellow Line of the Chennai Metro from Poonamallee to Parandur at a cost of ₹107.12 billion (US$1.1 billion). In August 2024, another new extension was proposed between the Airport and Poonamallee stations with the aim of connecting the existing airport with the new airport by metro.

In March 2025, Chennai Metro Rail Limited announced plans for an RRTS corridor connecting Chennai and Vellore via the Parandur Airport, with the detailed project report under preparation.

== See also ==
- Airports in India
- Transport in Chennai
