= Amritsar–Jammu high-speed rail corridor =

Under-construction high-speed rail line

Amritsar–Jammu High Speed Rail Corridor

Overview
- Status: Proposed
- Owner: Indian Railways
- Locale: Punjab; Jammu and Kashmir
- Termini: Amritsar; Jammu
- Stations: 6 (expected)
- Website: www.nhsrcl.in

Service
- Type: High-speed rail
- Operator: National High Speed Rail Corporation Limited
- Rolling stock: E5 Series Shinkansen

History
- Planned opening: 2032; 6 years' time

Technical
- Line length: 190 km (120 mi)
- Character: Elevated, underground and At-grade
- Track gauge: 1,435 mm (4 ft 8 1/2 in) standard gauge
- Electrification: 25 kV AC, 50 Hz, overhead catenary
- Operating speed: 320 km/h (200 mph)

Amritsar–Jammu High Speed Rail Corridor is a proposed high-speed rail line connecting Punjab's city, Amritsar with Jammu and Kashmir's winter capital, Jammu. It was one of the six new high-speed rail corridors planned in 2019. The line will be an extension of Delhi–Amritsar line.

This high-speed route will cut short the travelling time from New Delhi to Jammu by ten hours. This line is set to provide economic boost to Jammu as well as improve tourism connectivity for Vaishno Devi pilgrims.

== Possible stations ==
Amritsar, Batala, Gurdaspur, Pathankot, Samba, Jammu Tawi.

== See also ==
- Delhi–Amritsar high-speed rail corridor
- High-speed rail in India
