= Delhi–Ahmedabad high-speed rail corridor =

Under-construction high-speed rail line in India

Delhi–Ahmedabad High Speed Rail Corridor

Overview
- Status: DPR prepared, awaiting for approval
- Owner: Indian Railways
- Locale: Gujarat; Rajasthan; Haryana; Delhi
- Termini: Delhi; Ahmedabad
- Stations: 15
- Website: www.nhsrcl.in

Service
- Type: High-speed rail
- Operator: National High Speed Rail Corporation Limited
- Rolling stock: E10 Series Shinkansen

History
- Planned opening: 2031; 5 years' time

Technical
- Line length: 886 km (551 mi)
- Character: Elevated, underground and grade-separated
- Track gauge: 1,435 mm (4 ft 8 1/2 in) standard gauge
- Electrification: 25 kV AC, 50 Hz, overhead catenary
- Operating speed: 320 km/h (200 mph)

Delhi–Ahmedabad High Speed Rail Corridor (Delhi–Ahmedabad HSR) is a proposed high-speed rail line connecting India's capital Delhi with the city of Ahmedabad. When completed, it will be India's second high-speed rail line. It is also said to be an extension of Mumbai–Ahmedabad HSR corridor.

After Lidar surveys were completed in September 2020, the detailed projects report (DPR) was being prepared. This is estimated to cut travel time between the cities from fifteen hours to under five hours.

== Construction ==
After the DPR was prepared, the construction was planned to start in the later half of 2020s. The alignment was chosen to run along with some of the existing railway line and highway in order to reduce the burden of land acquisition as experienced in other railway projects in India, such as the Mumbai-Ahmedabad line and Delhi Metro Pink Line which were significantly delayed due to land acquisition problems. The officials stated that it would take up to three to four years to acquire the land, shift utilities, get several clearances and NOCs for various departments, cut trees, and to complete other works. It would then take another three years to complete construction, moving the opening date to no sooner than 2031.

== Stations ==
The route would originate from Dwarka Sector 21 in Delhi, then it would cross into Gurgaon at Chauma. The line would then run along Dwarka expressway till Ramaprastha City, then it would take a right turn to align with Delhi–Jaipur railway line and crossing at KMP Expressway and will continue along with Rewari Jaipur (via Narnaul-Chomu) Railway Line. The alignment will run alongside existing Railway lines to avoid problems in Land acquisition. Earlier it was proposed to run along with Delhi–Jaipur NH48 Highway. The railway line will cross after Udaipur Station into Gujarat and through Himmatnagar will reach Ahmedabad and further onwards will connect with Mumbai Ahmedabad High Speed Rail Corridor.

== Project status ==
As of February 18, 2026

Work	Progress
Work	2026
Land acquisition	0%
Piling	0%
Piers	0%
Viaduct	0%
Tracks	0%

=== 2020–2023: Preparations of Detailed Project Report ===
In February 2020, NHRCL invited bids for a Li-DAR survey in order to prepare final alignment design for the six corridors including Delhi-Ahmedabad. There would be two surveys, with the first one from the satellite imagery data to study the corridor's topography and the following would be an aerial survey to help in finalising the Detailed Project Report (DPR) of the corridor. A year later in January 2021, the tenders for the preparation of DPR of the corridor through a Li-DAR survey had been awarded already according to a NHSRCL spokesperson. and the work on LIDAR survey was in progress. Later in July, the DPR was completed with the route originating from the Dwarka sector 21 in Delhi. A station was proposed in Manesar, Haryana. Officials stated that it would take three to four years to acquire the entire land needed for the project, gain clearances and another three years for completing the construction. On 16 April 2024, the DPR of the corridor was approved by the Railways, three years after the submission. With an average speed of 250 km/h (160 mph), the 886 km (551 mi) long journey from Sabarmati in Ahmedabad, Gujarat to the Capital would reduce the existing 12 hour journey down to 3.5 hours.

== See also ==
- High-speed rail in India
  - Mumbai–Ahmedabad high-speed rail corridor
  - Delhi–Varanasi high-speed rail corridor
  - Delhi–Amritsar high-speed rail corridor
