= Greenfield airport =

Aviation facility with greenfield project characteristics

A greenfield airport is an aviation facility with greenfield project characteristics. The designation reflects certain environmental qualities (using previously undeveloped or empty greenfield land, for example) and commissioning, planning and construction processes that are generally carried out from scratch. While a green field in nature is defined as a wide expanse of natural land (meadow, prairie, grassland), here greenfield denotes that a project lacks any constraints imposed upon it by prior work or existing infrastructure. (A brownfield, on the other hand, remodels or improves upon existing facilities.) Such projects can be highly coveted by engineers as no time must be allotted for demolition of unneeded buildings, etc. constructed in developed areas for the development of the particular place

Modern greenfield airports are under construction in Beijing, Istanbul, Sydney and Chennai. Over the next two decades, the number of airports is expected to increase from 133 to 500. Of these, 367 are slated to be greenfield airports.

== Partial list of greenfield airports ==
Some of the world's greenfield airports opened since 1995. (Many smaller airports are also under development or proposed, especially in China, India and the Philippines.)

Airport	Year (Opened / Expected)	Country	City / Area
Al Maktoum International Airport	June 2010	United Arab Emirates	Dubai
Beijing Daxing International Airport	September 2019	China	Langfang, Hebei
Berlin Brandenburg Airport	October 2020	Germany	Berlin
Bhogapuram Airport	August 2026	India	near Visakhapatnam
Chennai Greenfield International Airport	2028–2035 (expected)	India	Parandur, Kanchipuram, near Chennai
Chengdu Tianfu International Airport	June 2021	China	Chengdu
Cochin International Airport	June 1999	India	near Kochi
Dalian Jinzhouwan International Airport	2024 (expected)	China	Dalian
Hamad International Airport	May 2014	Qatar	Doha
Hanthawaddy International Airport	(under construction)	Myanmar	Bago
Islamabad International Airport	May 2018	Pakistan	near Rawalpindi / Islamabad
Istanbul Airport	October 2018	Turkey	Istanbul
Itanagar Airport	December 2022	India	Hollongi, Arunachal Pradesh
Kannur International Airport	December 2018	India	Kerala
Kazi Nazrul Islam Airport	September 2013	India	Andal, West Bengal
Kempegowda International Airport	May 2008	India	near Bangalore, Karnataka
Manohar International Airport	December 2022	India	Mopa, Goa
Mattala Rajapaksa International Airport	March 2013	Sri Lanka	near Hambantota
Dinkar Balu Patil International Airport	December 2025	India	Navi Mumbai
Vadodara Airport	2017	India	near Harni, Vadodara, Gujarat
New International Airport for Mexico City	Cancelled (2018)	Mexico	Mexico City
New Gwadar International Airport	2025	Pakistan	Gwadar
Noida International Airport	2024 (Phase 1, expected)	India	Jewar, Gautam Buddha Nagar, near Delhi NCR
Pakyong Airport	October 2018	India	near Gangtok, Sikkim
Qingdao Jiaodong International Airport	August 2021	China	Qingdao
Rajiv Gandhi International Airport	March 2008	India	near Hyderabad
Rajkot Greenfield Airport	2023 (expected)	India	near Hirasar, Gujarat
Shirdi Airport	October 2017	India	near Shirdi
Techo Takhmao International Airport	2025 (expected)	Cambodia	near Phnom Penh
Western Sydney Airport	2026 (expected)	Australia	Badgerys Creek
Xiamen Xiang'an International Airport	2025 (expected)	China	Xiamen

== See also ==
- Greenfield project
- Greenfield land
- Brownfield land
