= ALFA-X =

Experimental Japanese high-speed shinkansen trainset

Class E956 "ALFA-X"
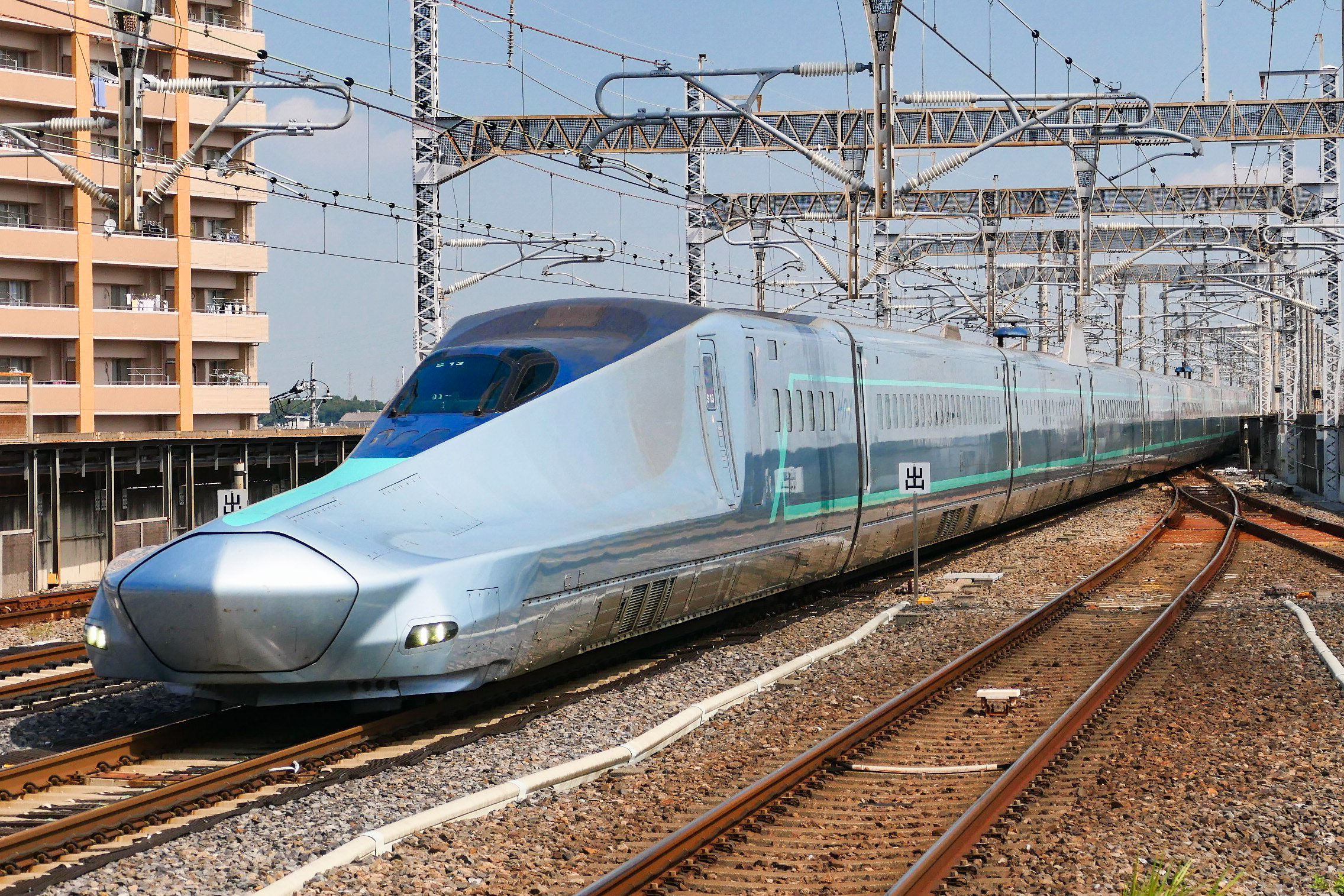
- ALFA-X train near Oyama Station
- In service: 2019–
- Manufacturers: Hitachi, Kawasaki Heavy Industries
- Entered service: 9 May 2019
- Number built: 10 cars
- Number in service: 10 cars (1 set)
- Formation: 10 cars
- Fleet numbers: S13
- Operator: JR East
- Line served: Tōhoku Shinkansen

Specifications
- Car length: End cars: 26.25 m (86 ft 1 in); Intermediate cars: 24.5 m (80 ft)
- Width: 3.35 m (11.0 ft)
- Height: 3.7 m (12 ft 2 in)
- Maximum speed: 400 km/h (250 mph)
- Traction system: 4 × 500 kW (670 hp) motors per car
- Power output: 12,000 kW (16,000 hp)
- Electric system: Overhead line, 25 kV 50 Hz AC
- Current collection: Pantograph
- Track gauge: 1,435 mm (4 ft 8 1/2 in) standard gauge

The Class E956 (Japanese: E956形), branded "ALFA-X", is a ten-car experimental Japanese Shinkansen high-speed train operated by the East Japan Railway Company (JR East) in Japan capable of operating at up to 400 kilometres per hour (250 mph) to test technologies for future trains capable of operating at speeds of up to 360 kilometres per hour (225 mph). The name is an acronym for "Advanced Labs for Frontline Activity in rail eXperimentation". The train was unveiled on 9 May 2019. Test runs are conducted primarily on sections of the Tōhoku Shinkansen between Sendai and Shin-Aomori, and occasionally on the Hokkaido Shinkansen.

== Design ==
The ALFA-X experimental trainset is being tested at speeds of up to 400 km/h (250 mph) to evaluate technologies intended for future trains operating in revenue service at speeds of up to 360 km/h (225 mph). These include vibration-damping systems designed to reduce oscillation and the risk of derailment during major earthquakes, as well as body designs intended to reduce snow adhesion. Some design features have not been publicly disclosed in order to protect ongoing technical research.

Much of the design changes and experimentation conducted with the ALFA-X focuses on reducing noise at very high operating speeds.

The ALFA-X evaluates two different end-car nose profiles, similar to those used on the earlier Fastech 360 experimental trains. The nose of car 1 is 16 metres (52 ft) long, comparable in length to that of the E5 series, but features a new, more angular profile. By contrast, the nose of car 10 uses the same "arrow-line" profile as the E5 series but is extended to 22 metres (72 ft), leaving only 4.5 metres (15 ft) for the passenger compartment, which accommodates just three rows of seating. The differing designs are intended to compare aerodynamic drag and the "tunnel boom" noises generated by pressure waves as trains enter and exit tunnels.

Cars 1–6 were manufactured by Kawasaki Heavy Industries, while cars 7–10 were manufactured by Hitachi. Among the intermediate cars, cars 3 and 7 have smaller windows to evaluate wind resistance, while car 5 has no windows. These cars are used to assess vehicle structure and interior environmental conditions based on window size and configuration. Car 8, a prototype Gran Class car, is divided into two compartments to allow comparative evaluation of passenger comfort. Testing equipment is installed in both lead cars (cars 1 and 10) as well as the central car (car 5).

The trainset is also equipped with different pantograph and sound-insulation fin configurations to assess noise generation and aerodynamic performance. Cars 3 and 7 are fitted with functional pantographs and sound-insulation fins, cars 4 and 6 are equipped with pantograph bases only, and car 5 carries a non-power-collecting pantograph.

The E956 incorporates eddy current brakes and an aerodynamic braking system mounted on the roof, commonly referred to as air brakes or spoilers.

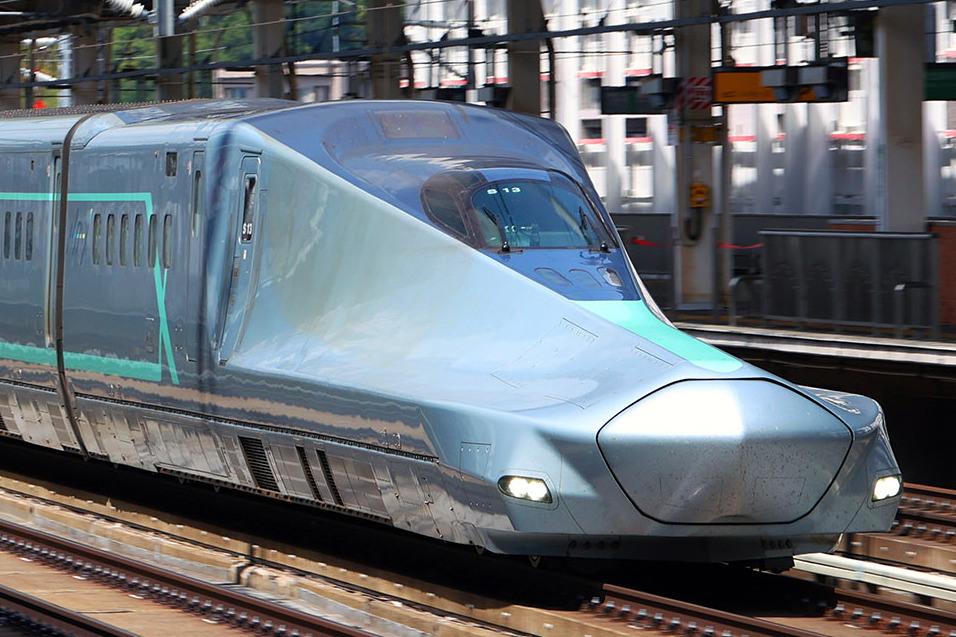
Car 1, with angular nose

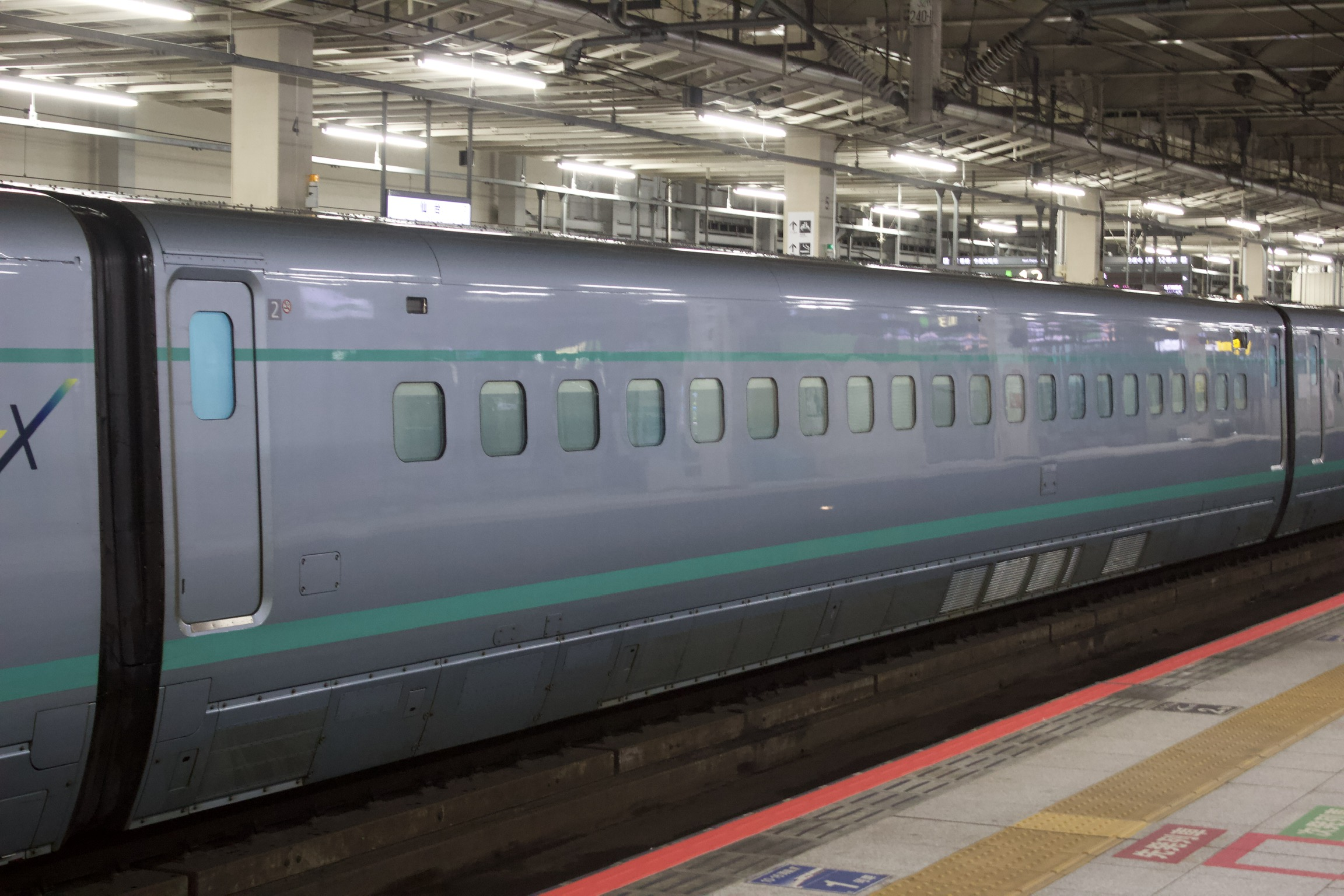
Car 2

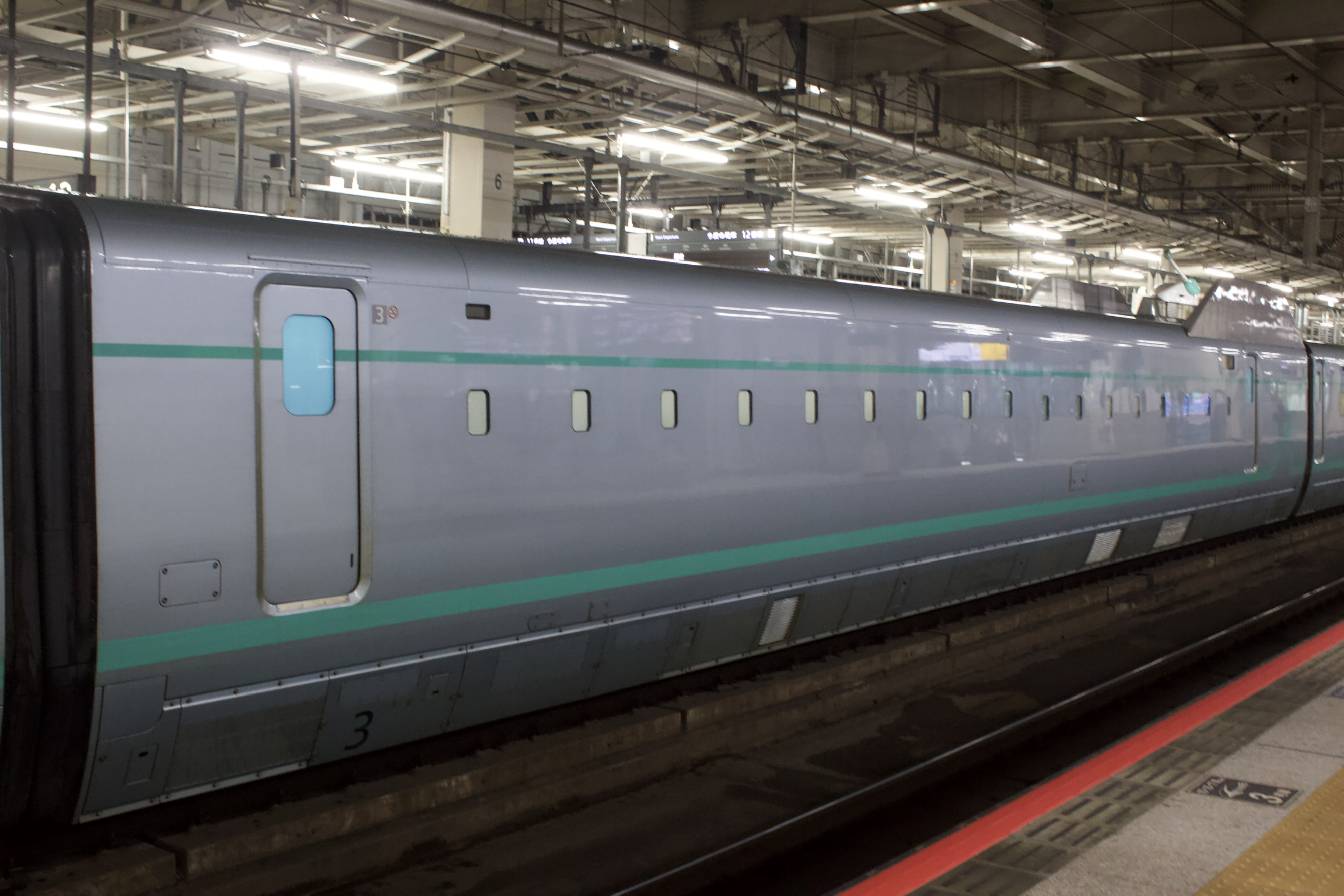
Car 3, with smaller windows

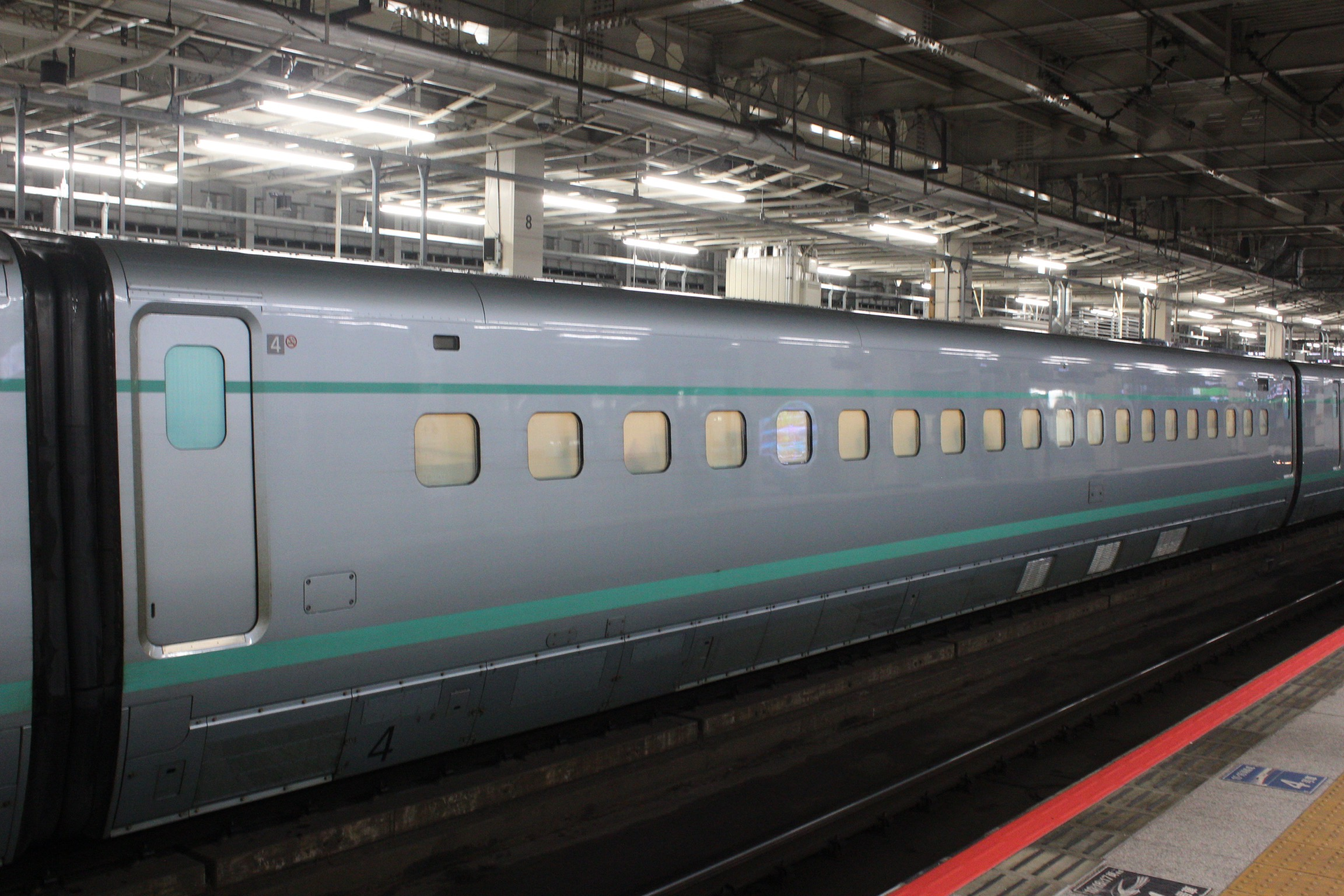
Car 4

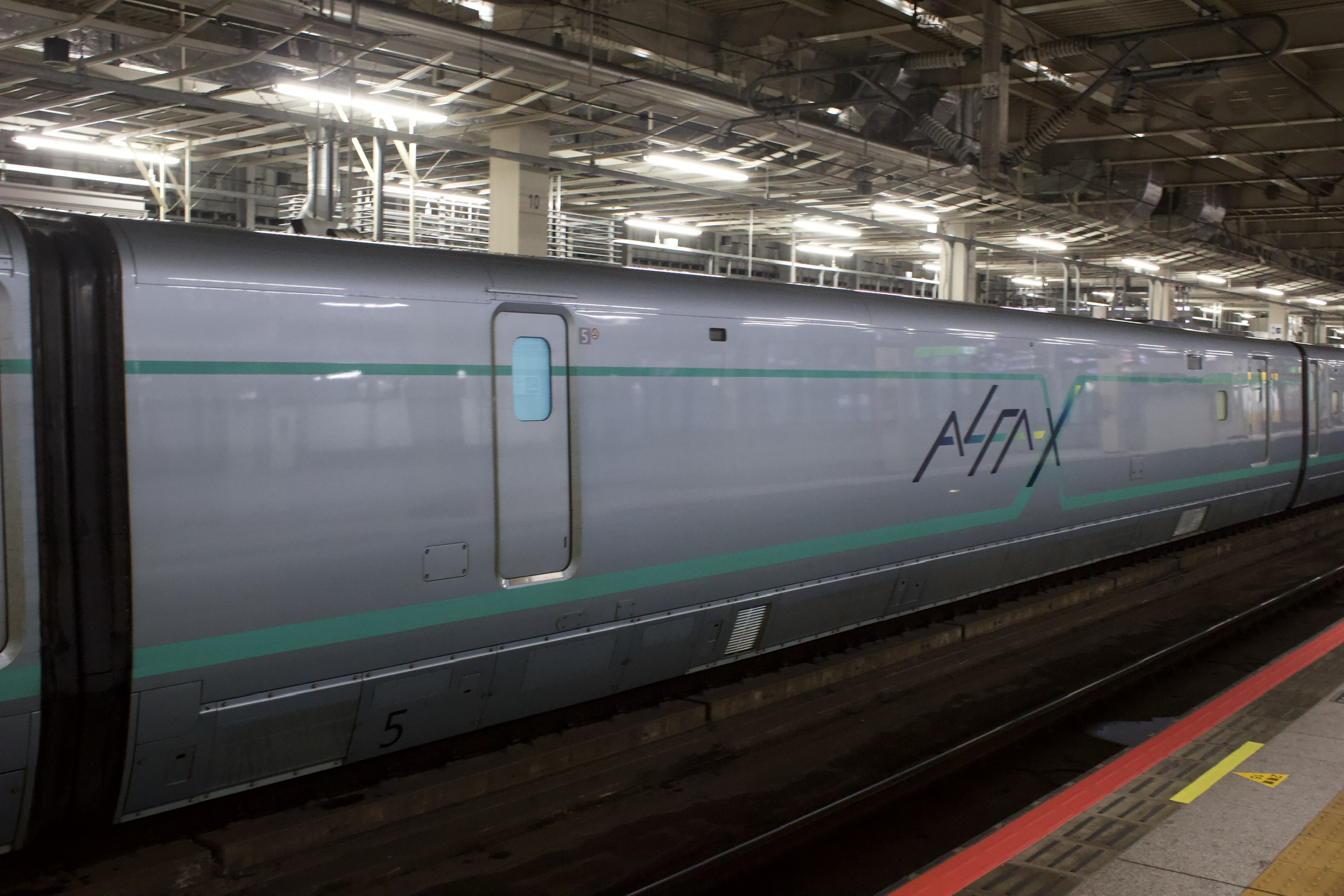
Car 5, with no windows

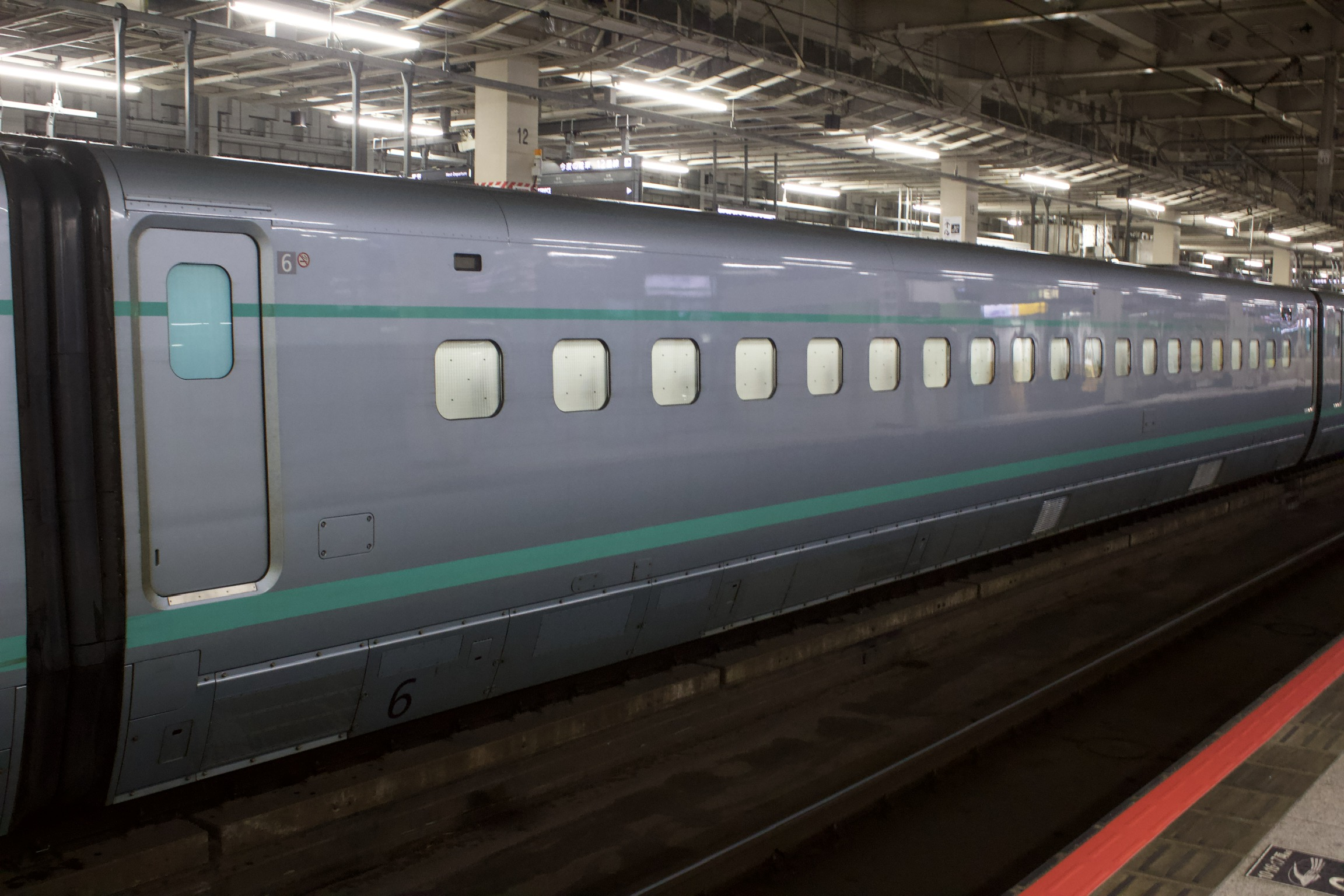
Car 6

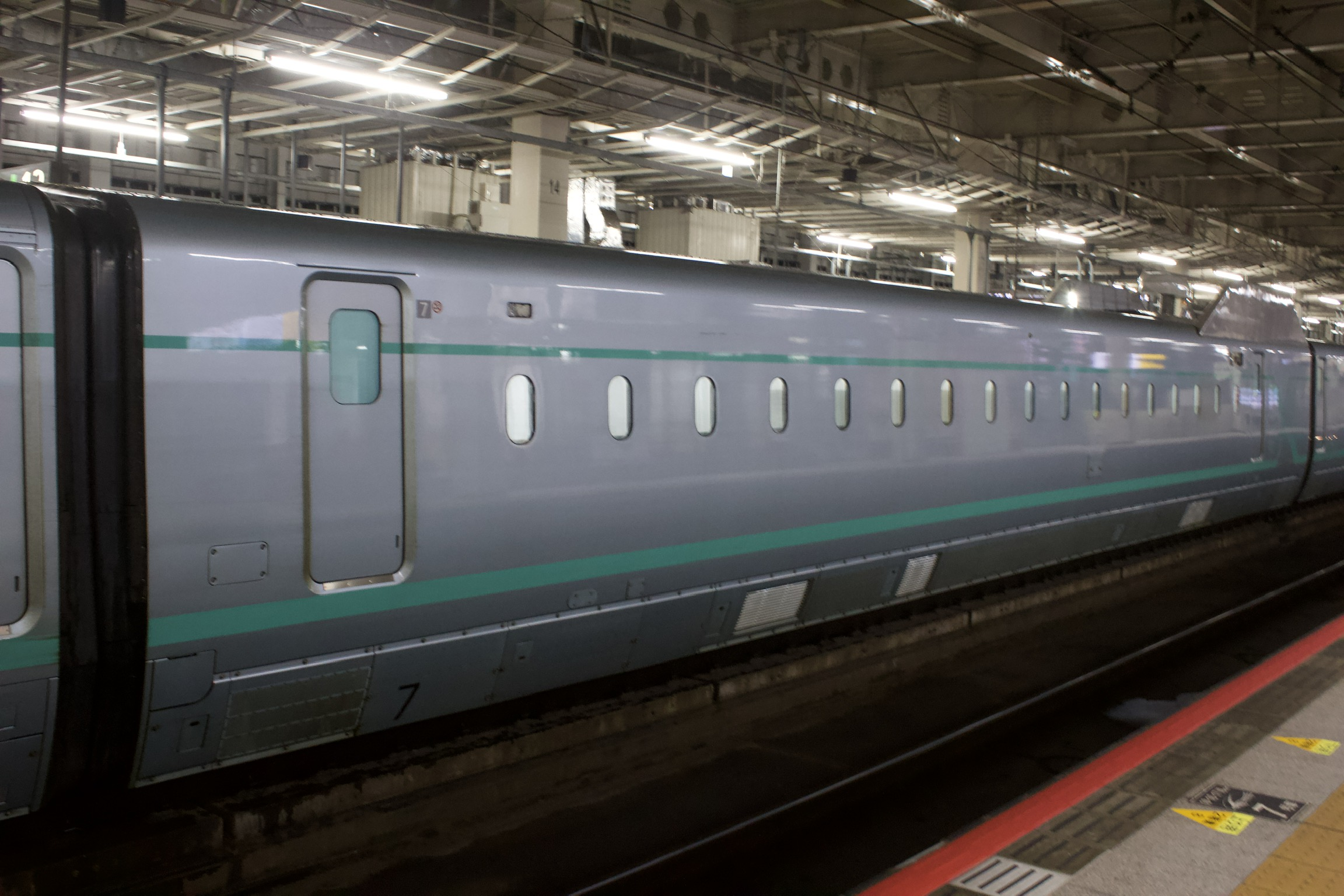
Car 7, with smaller windows

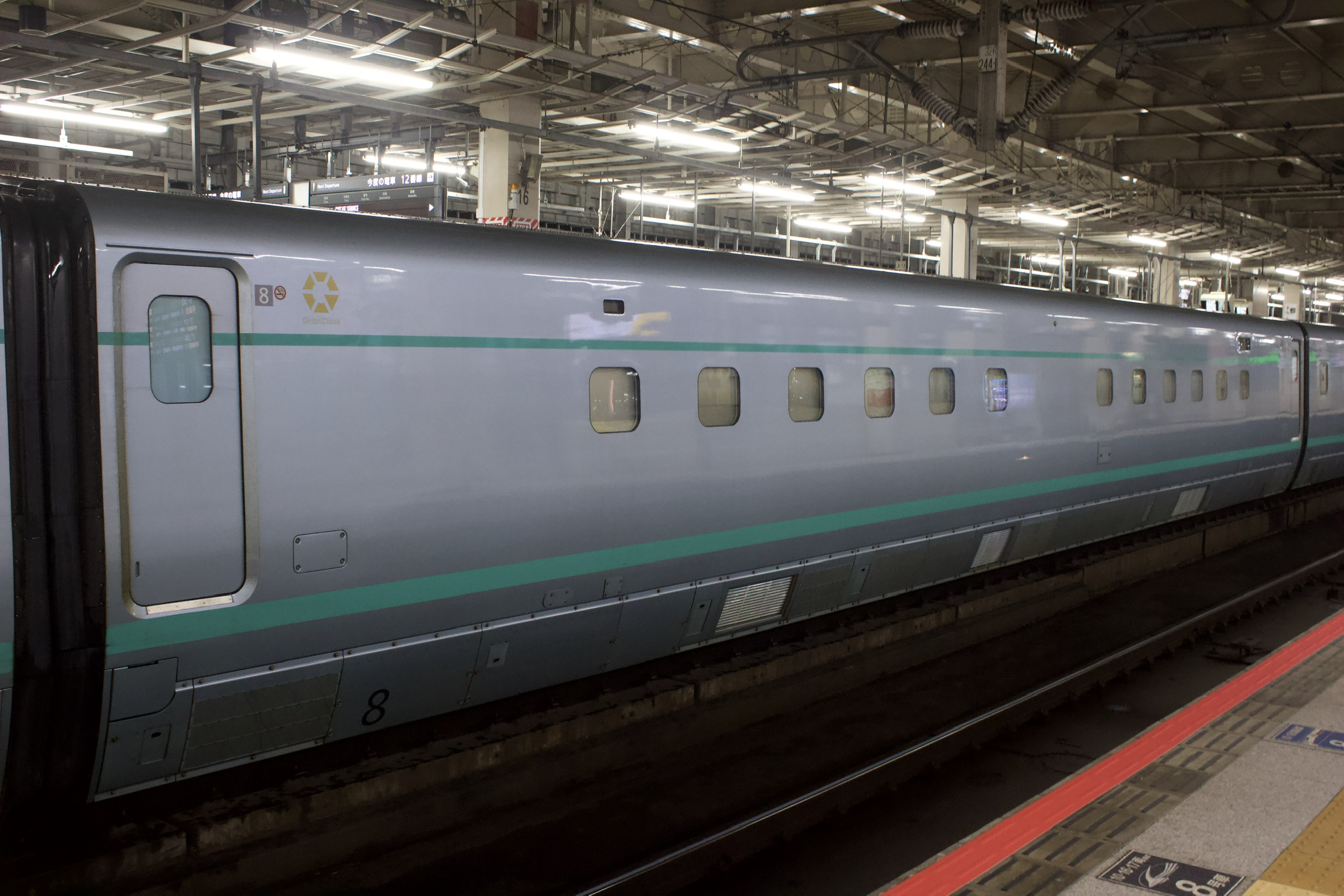
Car 8, prototype Gran Class car

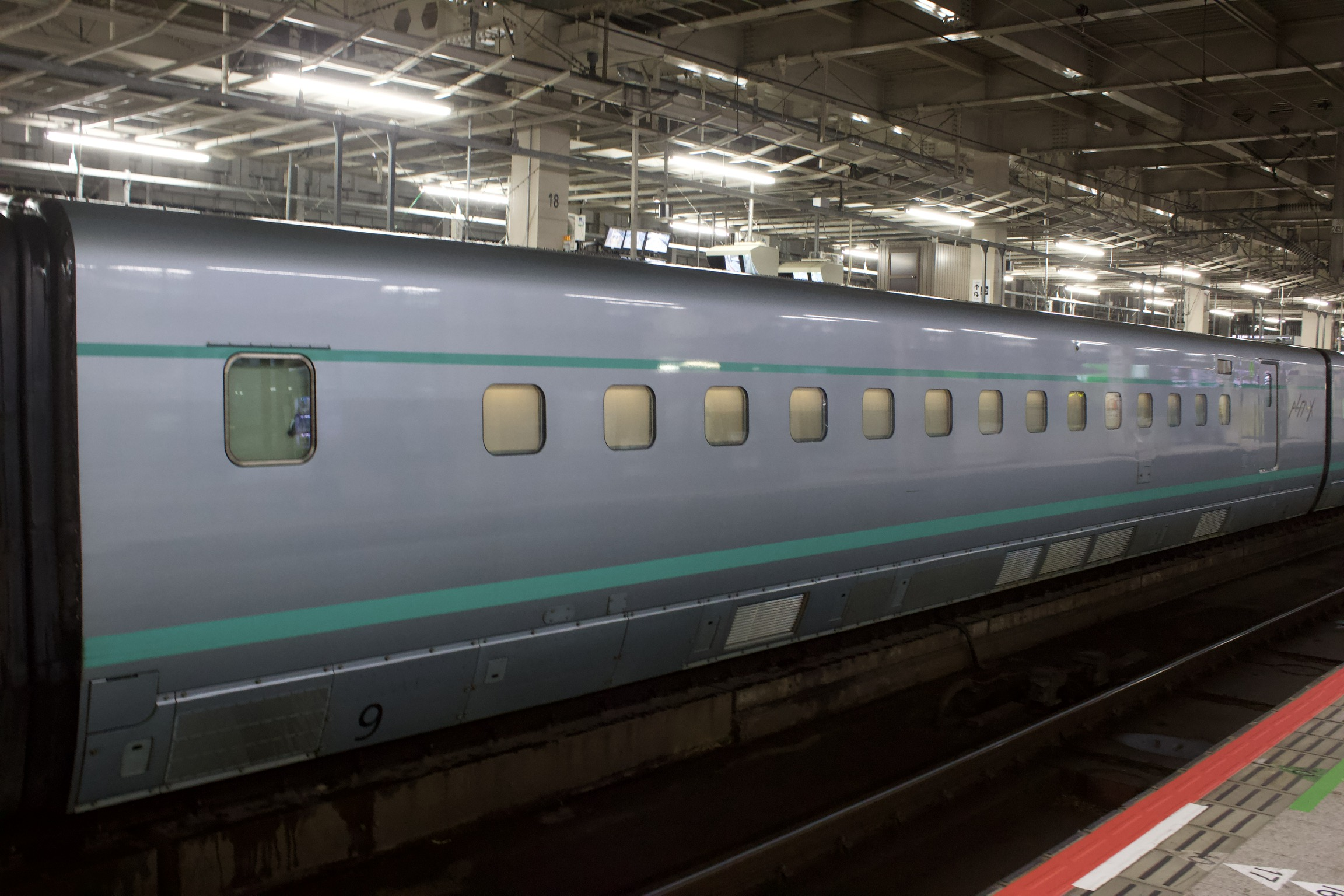
Car 9, prototype Green car

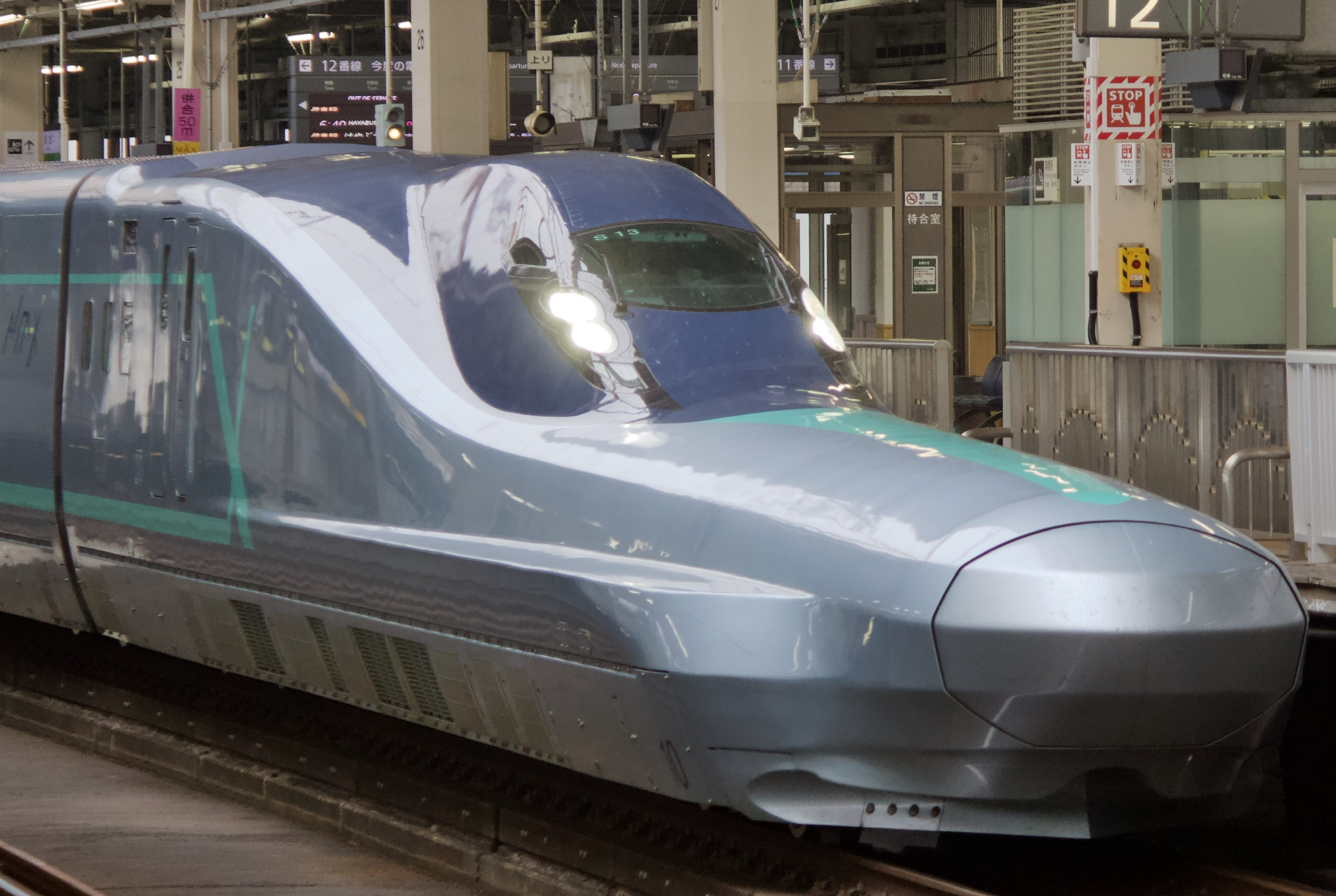
Car 10, with 22-metre (72 ft) nose

== History ==
JR East officially announced its plans to build a ten-car ALFA-X test train on 4 July 2017, to be delivered in spring 2019 for extensive testing and evaluation.

The body of car 1 was unveiled at Kawasaki Heavy Industries' Hyogo Works on December 12, 2018. The body of car 10 was unveiled at Hitachi's Kasado Works on February 8, 2019.

The finished train was unveiled on 9 May 2019.

The train reached a speed of 320 km/h (200 mph) in May 2019, matching the top operating speed of the fastest services on the line. By June that same year, the train was regularly measured to be running at 360 km/h (225 mph) by rail enthusiasts.

The train was first observed running at the announced top planned test speed of 400 km/h (250 mph) on 14 December 2019.

The train was observed in Hokkaido for cold weather testing on 12 February 2020 and 3 February 2021.

== E10 Series Shinkansen ==
The E10 Series Shinkansen, which will enter commercial service in FY2030, will be developed based on the technology demonstrated in the ALFA-X, but its commercial service at 360 km/h has been postponed because the extension of the Hokkaido Shinkansen line to Sapporo has been postponed until the late 2030s. The trains to be introduced when the line is extended to Sapporo will be based on the E10 series.

In January 2025, The Hindustan Times reported, citing anonymous sources, that the production version of the ALFA-X, known as the E10, may simultaneously enter service in Japan and on the Mumbai-Ahmedabad high-speed rail corridor in 2029 or 2030. The International Railway Journal, however, claimed on the contrary that Japan was "reportedly unwilling to offer the new-generation Shinkansen to India".

== Wireless communication experiment ==
On January 28, 2021, JR East and NTT Docomo announced that they conducted a demonstration experiment of 5G wireless communication services on the Tohoku Shinkansen between Sendai Station and Shin-Aomori Station from October to December 2020, traveling at a speed of 360 km/h. 5G has the problem of unstable communication quality due to the Doppler effect and the influence of obstacles around the tracks, so NTT Docomo had been conducting demonstration experiments since 2017. Equipment compliant with 3GPP international standard specifications was used for the demonstration experiment, and as a result, high-speed communication with 5G was sufficient, and high-definition 4K and 8K video was stably transmitted via 5G.

== In media ==
The ALFA-X is featured in the film Bullet Train Explosion.
