= Delhi–Amritsar high-speed rail corridor =

Under-construction high-speed rail line

Delhi–Amritsar High Speed Rail Corridor

Overview
- Status: DPR under preparation
- Owner: Indian Railways
- Locale: Delhi; Haryana; Punjab
- Termini: Delhi; Amritsar
- Stations: 15
- Website: www.nhsrcl.in

Service
- Type: High-speed rail
- Operator: National High Speed Rail Corporation Limited
- Rolling stock: E10 Series Shinkansen

History
- Planned opening: 2051; 25 years' time

Technical
- Line length: 459 km (285 mi)
- Character: Elevated, underground and At-grade
- Track gauge: 1,435 mm (4 ft 8 1/2 in) standard gauge
- Electrification: 25 kV AC, 50 Hz, overhead catenary
- Operating speed: 320 km/h (200 mph)

Delhi–Amritsar High Speed Rail Corridor is a planned high-speed rail line connecting India's capital, New Delhi and Punjab's city Amritsar. It was one of the six new high-speed rail corridors planned in 2019.

The high-speed route connecting important cities of Northern India will cut short the distance from existing six hours to under two.

== Stations ==
The train would start from Dwarka in Delhi, and will have stoppages at Asaudha, Rohtak, Jind, Kaithal, Mohali, Ludhiana and Jalandhar.

=== Amritsar–Jammu ===
According to the National Rail Plan (NRP) unveiled by the Ministry of Railways, the Delhi–Amritsar line would be extended until Jammu via Pathankot, in order to provide economic boost to Jammu as well as to improve tourism connectivity for Vaishno Devi.

== See also ==
- High-speed rail in India
  - Delhi–Ahmedabad high-speed rail corridor
  - Delhi–Varanasi high-speed rail corridor
