= Chennai–Bengaluru high-speed rail corridor =

High-speed rail corridor project in India

Chennai–Bengaluru High Speed Rail Corridor

Overview
- Status: Approved
- Owner: Indian Railways
- Locale: Tamil Nadu; Andhra Pradesh; Karnataka
- Termini: Chennai; Bengaluru
- Stations: 7
- Website: www.nhsrcl.in

Service
- Type: High-speed rail
- Operator: National High Speed Rail Corporation Limited

History
- Planned opening: 2035; 9 years' time

Technical
- Line length: 306 km (190 mi)
- Character: Elevated, underground, grade-separated
- Track gauge: 1,435 mm (4 ft 8 1/2 in) standard gauge
- Electrification: 25 kV AC, 50 Hz, overhead catenary
- Operating speed: 350 km/h (220 mph)

The Chennai–Bengaluru High Speed Rail corridor (Chennai–Bengaluru HSR) is India's third high-speed rail project after the Mumbai Ahmedabad High Speed Rail Corridor and Delhi Varanasi High Speed Rail Corridor. The 306 km HSR corridor will connect Chennai to Bengaluru through 6 stations.

== History ==
In 2013, Karnataka Chief Minister Siddaramaiah, suggested that the state wanted to run bullet trains from Bengaluru to Chennai, and was conducting talks with his counterparts in Japan about the topic. He commented that the journey could be done in less than two hours, though no studies had yet been conducted prior to those words.

A feasibility study by China on the project was submitted to the Federal Government in June 2015. While Germany also proposed to conduct its own feasibility study at the same time. The then Railways Minister, Suresh Prabhu, suggested that the route would be one of the next high-speed railways to be implemented in India.

Japan Railway Technical Service (JARTS) and Oriental Consultants submitted a feasibility study in early 2016 about constructing the high-speed railway line through a PPP with the government. French state-owned company SNCF also expressed an interest in building a high-speed railway line too.

In early 2017, Indian Railways (IR) responded to a proposal by Elon Musk for a Hyperloop to connect the two cities in thirty minutes, saying that it would be unlikely due to government bureaucracy.

During the June 2017 opening of Bengaluru's Green Line Metro, Japan’s Ambassador to India, Kenji Hiramatsu, suggested that the railway line should be built with support from Japanese development funds.

== Description ==
The high-speed railway line would mainly be built alongside the existing railway between the two cities. However, a 38-kilometre-long (24 mi) viaduct between Bangarapet and Vaniyambadi, as well as a 44-kilometre-long (27 mi) viaduct between Katpadi and Arakkonam, would need to be constructed due to hilly terrain.

There would be two new railway stations built underground in Chennai and one at Bengaluru, would witness the high-speed trains, running at around 320 km/h (200 mph)

== Stations ==
The Chennai Bengaluru high speed rail corridor is planned to have a total of twelve stations.

The rail corridor is planned to run through Chennai city underground from Chennai Central to Poonamallee, with alignments suggesting it will run parallel to existing railway line till Avadi before heading to Poonamallee. From Poonamallee, the high-speed line will connect Chennai Greenfield Airport at Parandur and then run parallel to Bengaluru–Chennai Expressway from there, with few stations such as Poonamalee, Parandur, Chittoor, Kolar and Kodihalli confirmed as per local sources.

== Project status ==
Work	Progress
Work	2025
Land acquisition	48.05%
Piling	0%
Piers	0%
Viaduct	0%
Tracks	0%

=== 2018 ===
- November: German government submitted a feasibility study to the Railway Board

=== 2020 ===
- June: Indian Railways sanctioned the feasibility studies for the corridor

=== 2021 ===
- February: Aarvee-GSL awarded the contract for Chennai-Bengaluru HSR's LiDAR & Alignment Design contract.

=== 2022 ===
- July: Infrastructure Minister of Karnataka, V. Somanna reveled that the centre had asked NHSRCL to submit the DPR to implement the project. The state government held a high level meeting and discussed about alignment going through the upcoming 10-lane Bengaluru-Mysuru highway. While the state government is set to provide the land, the centre will bear the entire project's cost.

=== 2025 ===
- June: Final surveys and alignment markings are currently being carried out, signifying the move from the planning stage to the commencement of on-site groundwork

== See also ==
- High-speed rail in India
  - Mumbai–Ahmedabad high-speed rail corridor
  - Mumbai-Hyderabad high-speed rail corridor
  - Diamond Quadrilateral
  - National High Speed Rail Corporation Limited
- Other
  - Vande Bharat Express
