= Parandur =

- Village
- Location in Tamil Nadu, India
- Country: India
- State: Tamil Nadu
- District: Kanchipuram district
- Time zone: UTC+5:30 (IST)
- Area code: +91-44
- Official language: Tamil
- Spoken languages: Tamil, English

Parandur, is a village in Kanchipuram district in the state of Tamil Nadu, India.

It was the proposed site of a Chennai Greenfield Airport.
