= Ottivakkam =

Coordinates: 12.623253°N 79.974428°E

Ottivakkam is a suburb of Chennai located south of Tirumani. It has a suburban railway station and falls under south line.
