= Mumbai–Hyderabad high-speed rail corridor =

Under-construction high-speed rail line

Mumbai–Hyderabad High Speed Rail Corridor

Overview
- Status: DPR Prepared, To be approved by the government
- Owner: Indian Railways
- Locale: Maharashtra; Karnataka; Telangana
- Termini: Mumbai; Hyderabad
- Stations: 10
- Website: www.nhsrcl.in

Service
- Type: High-speed rail
- Operator: National High Speed Rail Corporation Limited
- Rolling stock: E5 Series Shinkansen

History
- Planned opening: Unknown

Technical
- Line length: 711 km (442 mi)
- Character: TBD (Elevated, underground, and grade-separated)
- Track gauge: 1,435 mm (4 ft 8 1/2 in) standard gauge
- Electrification: 25 kV AC, 50 Hz, overhead catenary
- Operating speed: 350 km/h (220 mph)

The Mumbai–Hyderabad High Speed Rail Corridor is a planned high-speed rail line connecting India's economic hub Mumbai with India's technology hub Hyderabad. When completed, it will a key link in India's high-speed rail line network along with the Mumbai-Ahmedabad line.

Set to be the third high-speed rail line project of India involving Mumbai and also the third involving Hyderabad, this project will reduce the travel time between the two cities from existing 15 hours journey to around 3.5 hours journey. The terminal for this corridor may be built in Navi Mumbai, which is planned to be integrated with Navi Mumbai International Airport. Besides the airport, it will be linked with Navi Mumbai Metro and the connectivity is further set to expand with a connection to the Mumbai Trans Harbour Link.

At the other end, the line will terminate at the Hyderabad High Speed Rail Hub which is planned to be constructed over 500 acres in Shamshabad, close to the Rajiv Gandhi International Airport. This High Speed Rail Hub will provide connectivity to the Hyderabad–Bengaluru high speed rail corridor and the Hyderabad–Chennai high speed rail corridor, and also provide easy transfers to the Hyderabad airport.

== Stations ==
Planned stations - Mumbai BKC, Navi Mumbai International Airport, Lonavala, Pimpri Chinchwad, Pune, Baramati, Pandharpur, Solapur, Kalaburagi, Vikarabad and Hyderabad.

== See also ==
- Hyderabad–Bengaluru high-speed rail corridor
- Chennai-Bengaluru-Mysuru high-speed rail corridor
- Mumbai–Ahmedabad high-speed rail corridor
- Mumbai–Nagpur high-speed rail corridor
