= Delhi–Kolkata high-speed rail corridor =

High speed rail corridor

Overview
- Status: Approved
- Locale: Delhi; Uttar Pradesh; Bihar; Jharkhand; West Bengal
- Termini: New Delhi; Howrah
- Stations: TBA

Service
- Type: High-speed rail
- Operator: Indian Railways

Technical
- Line length: 1,669 km (1,037 mi)
- Track gauge: 1,435 mm (4 ft 8 1/2 in) standard gauge
- Electrification: 25 kV AC overhead lines
- Operating speed: 320 km/h (200 mph)

The Delhi–Kolkata high-speed rail corridor is one of the route of the proposed high-speed rail in India. The line is part of the Diamond Quadrilateral Program, which seeks to unite the cities of New Delhi, Kolkata, Mumbai and Chennai via high speed rail. This travels along the Howrah-Delhi main line from Tundla to Howrah. The train expects to cut the journey time for the 1,500 km (930 mi) between the national capital of India, New Delhi, and the capital of the Indian state of West Bengal, the city of Kolkata, to just 5 hours 30 minutes.

According to the British company Mott McDonald, which undertook a pre-feasibility study of the project, the estimated cost for construction will be around ₹5 trillion (US$52 billion). The speed expected is 200–320 km/h (120–200 mph). A second phase of the project has been already taken up to extend the corridor to the Howrah Terminus (Howrah Railway Station) in the metropolitan city of Kolkata.

Currently, the international consortium INECO-TYPSA-ICT is carrying out the feasibility study.

== Status Update ==
Delhi-Varanasi Corridor (Phase I)

- October 2020: Feasibility report submitted to Ministry of Railways
- December 2020: NHSRCL to conduct ground survey using LiDAR technique
- January 2025: NHSRCL starts LiDAR survey

Section	Description	Designed speed (km/h)	Length (km)	Construction start date	Open date
Delhi–Kolkata high-speed corridor	HSR Corridors of Northern and Eastern India, consisting of the Delhi-Varanasi section & Varanasi-Kolkata.	350	1669	-	-
Delhi–Varanasi section		350	958		
Varanasi–Kolkata section		350	711		
