= Mumbai–Nagpur high-speed rail corridor =

Proposed Bullet Train Project in Maharashtra, India

Mumbai–Nagpur Bullet Train Project

Overview
- Status: Railway board submitted a detailed project report to Railway minister of India for approval
- Owner: Indian Railways
- Locale: Maharashtra
- Termini: Mumbai; Nagpur
- Stations: 15
- Website: www.nhsrcl.in

Service
- Type: High-speed rail
- Operator: National High Speed Rail Corporation Limited
- Rolling stock: E5 Series Shinkansen

History
- Completed: 2032 (Projected)

Technical
- Line length: 742 km (461 mi)
- Character: TBD (Elevated, underground, and grade-separated)
- Track gauge: 1,435 mm (4 ft 8 1/2 in) standard gauge
- Electrification: 25 kV AC, 50 Hz, overhead catenary
- Operating speed: 320 km/h (200 mph)

The Mumbai–Nagpur High-Speed Rail Corridor is a proposed high-speed rail line connecting Maharashtra's two major cities, Mumbai and Nagpur. It will be the second line which links Mumbai.

The route is set to be 742 km (461 mi) in length, running entirely within the state of Maharashtra. 68% route will run along the Mumbai–Nagpur Expressway. The cost of the project is expected to ₹1.7 lakh crore (US$18 billion).

== Project status ==
=== 2021 ===
- March: Aerial LiDar survey begins.

=== 2022 ===
- February: DPR Submitted to Railway Board.

=== 2023 ===
- September: The railway board submitted the detailed project report to the Railway Ministry for approval. 68% of the bullet train line will be along Samruddhi highway.

== Route description ==
The proposed Mumbai-Nagpur High-Speed Rail Corridor is planned to run along the Mumbai–Nagpur Expressway (Samruddhi Mahamarg), national highways, greenfield areas, and may pass through arterial roads of the intermediate city road network for high-speed rail connectivity between different cities along the corridor.

The route will have 15 stations: BKC, Thane, Shahapur, Ghoti Budruk, Nashik, Shirdi, Aurangabad, Jalna, Mehkar, Malegaon Jahangir, Karanja Lad, Pulgaon, Wardha, Khapri and Ajni (Nagpur).

== Fares ==
The fare structure is yet to be finalized but is expected to be 1.5 times the existing first-class AC fare on the Indian Railways' current service. The line's official fare structure, prices and rules are expected to be finalized closer to the start of commercial operations.

== See also ==
- High-speed rail in India
  - Nagpur–Varanasi high-speed rail corridor
  - Mumbai–Ahmedabad high-speed rail corridor
  - Mumbai–Hyderabad high-speed rail corridor
