= Varanasi–Howrah high-speed rail corridor =

Under-construction high-speed rail line

Varanasi–Kolkata High Speed Rail Corridor

Overview
- Status: DPR being prepared
- Owner: Indian Railways
- Locale: Uttar Pradesh; Bihar; Jharkhand; West Bengal
- Termini: Varanasi; Kolkata
- Stations: 10
- Website: www.nhsrcl.in

Service
- Type: High-speed rail
- Operator: National High Speed Rail Corporation Limited
- Rolling stock: E10 Series Shinkansen

History
- Planned opening: 2031; 5 years' time

Technical
- Line length: 711 km (442 mi)
- Character: TBD (Elevated, underground, and grade-separated)
- Track gauge: 1,435 mm (4 ft 8 1/2 in) standard gauge
- Electrification: 25 kV AC, 50 Hz, overhead catenary
- Operating speed: 350 km/h (220 mph)

The Varanasi–Kolkata High Speed Rail Corridor is a planned high-speed rail line connecting Varanasi with the city of Kolkata. When completed, it will be a portion of the Delhi-Kolkata High-Speed Rail Corridor.

The project will connect the five major cities: Varanasi, Patna, Gaya, Dhanbad and Kolkata (Howrah) of Eastern India. The route is set to be of 760 kilometres in length, with number of stations and cost of project yet to be finalised.

== Stations ==
The proposed stations on this corridor are:

- Varanasi
- Buxar
- Arrah
- Patna
- Gaya
- Dhanbad
- Asansol
- Durgapur
- Burdwan
- Howrah

== Project status ==
=== 2022 ===
- November: According to the report, the survey work on the corridor was completed in Bihar. The 718 km long stretch was set to be completely elevated with stations in Buxar, Patna, Gaya, Dhanbad, Asansol, Durgapur and Howrah. The preparation for land acquisition was started and the officials were awaiting for the green signal from railways to start acquiring the land and thereby starting the construction. The train would complete the journey in just over two hours with a speed of 350 kmph.

== See also ==
- High-speed rail in India
  - Chennai–Mysuru high-speed rail corridor
  - Delhi–Varanasi high-speed rail corridor
