= E10 Series Shinkansen =

Japanese high speed train type

E10 series
- Artists' impression of the future E10 series
- Stock type: Electric multiple unit
- In service: Planned for JFY2030
- Designer: Tangerine
- Replaced: E2 and E5 series
- Formation: 10 cars per trainset
- Operators: JR East; National High Speed Rail Corporation Limited
- Lines served: Tōhoku Shinkansen; Mumbai–Ahmedabad HSR

Specifications
- Maximum speed: 320 km/h (200 mph)
- Traction motors: Blowerless induction motor
- Electric system: Overhead line, 25 kV 50 Hz AC
- Current collection: Pantograph
- Track gauge: 1,435 mm (4 ft 8 1/2 in) standard gauge

The E10 series (Japanese: E10系) is a Japanese Shinkansen high-speed train type on order by East Japan Railway Company (JR East) for use on Tōhoku Shinkansen services. It is also proposed to be used on the Mumbai-Ahmedabad high speed rail corridor in India.

== Overview ==
Details of the new trains on order were announced by JR East on 4 March 2025. Scheduled for an introduction into service on the Tōhoku Shinkansen in fiscal 2030, the trains are planned to replace the E2 and E5 series fleets.

The safety technology incorporated in the trains will be derived from the experimental ALFA-X train. To protect against earthquake damage, L-shaped guides are installed on the cars to prevent derailment, dampers are installed to dampen the left-right swaying of the cars caused by earthquakes, and the stopping distance is reduced by 15% due to the improved performance of the brakes. The cars will be designed in anticipation of the introduction of automatic operation in the future and will be built to handle large amounts of digital data for efficient maintenance and inspection of the cars. To improve the efficiency of the propulsion system, silicon carbide elements will be used in the propulsion inverters, and induction motors that do not require cooling will be used for the first time on a commercial Shinkansen train.

The E10 series will eliminate the "Gran Class", the highest class of passenger accommodation introduced on the E5 series, and will instead introduce an enhanced "Train Desk" car intended to provide a work-oriented environment for business travelers. Unlike ordinary and Green cars, which encourage a quiet, library-like atmosphere, Train Desk cars permit phone calls, video conferences, and laptop use. To support this use, additional Wi-Fi routers will be installed to improve connectivity. Seating will be arranged in a 2+2 configuration, providing wider seats equipped with headrest wings and dividers between seats to improve sound insulation and privacy. Each seat will also feature a larger folding desk.

Car No. 5 will be fitted with a wide cargo door to support expansion of the "Hakobyun" priority cargo transport service. The cargo door will allow loading and unloading at intermediate stations, separate from passenger boarding and alighting, enabling faster delivery and smoother transport compared with conventional freight services.

The 360 km/h (220 mph) commercial operation demonstrated by ALFA-X has been postponed since the extension of the Hokkaido Shinkansen to Sapporo was postponed to the late 2030s due to delays in tunneling work, and the commercial operation speed of the E10 series is 320 km/h (200 mph), the same as the E5 series. JR East announced that it would consider building new Shinkansen trains based on the E10 series for trains to be put into service when the Hokkaido Shinkansen line is extended to Sapporo.

== Export to India ==
The Japanese and Indian governments are to adopt the train simultaneously, with the train type also seeing use on the under-construction Mumbai-Ahmedabad high speed rail corridor. The inter-governmental agreement initially specified India would purchase E5 series trains, however due to rising costs and postponements in their delivery, India moved to considering domestically produced trains. To break the deadlock in negotiations, the Japanese government offered to gift an E5 and E3 train set, to aid the line's commissioning in 2026 and to offer the E10 series for service entry in 2030. The inspection trains are to collect data to aid possible future production of E10 trains in India. Indian prime minister Narenda Modi's trip to Japan in August 2025 included a visit to the plant in Miyagi Prefecture where the E10 prototype is being developed.

These initial trains would see parallel use with planned train sets, developed by India's Integral Coach Factory, in collaboration with BEML, designed to operate in service at 250 km/h (160 mph), for use when the line partially opens for revenue service in 2027.

== Design ==
The E10 series' design was overseen by British design firm, Tangerine, the first overseas designer contracted by JR East for its rolling stock.

Externally, the E10 series trains will be finished in a livery of Tsugaru (津軽) green and "Evening elm" (イブニングエルム) green that evokes the mountains of Tōhoku region.
