= Delhi–Varanasi high-speed rail corridor =

Part of the Delhi-Kolkata high-speed rail network

Delhi–Varanasi High Speed Rail Corridor

Overview
- Status: Approved
- Owner: Indian Railways
- Locale: Delhi; Uttar Pradesh
- Termini: Delhi; Varanasi
- Stations: 13
- Website: www.nhsrcl.in

Service
- Type: High-speed rail
- Operator: National High Speed Rail Corporation Limited
- Rolling stock: E10 Series Shinkansen

History
- Planned opening: 2041; 15 years' time

Technical
- Line length: 813 km (505 mi)
- Character: Elevated, underground, grade-separated
- Track gauge: 1,435 mm (4 ft 8 1/2 in) standard gauge
- Electrification: 25 kV AC, 50 Hz, overhead catenary
- Operating speed: 350 km/h (220 mph)

Delhi–Varanasi High Speed Rail Corridor (Delhi–Varanasi HSR) is India's second High-speed rail project after the Mumbai-Ahmedabad High Speed Rail Corridor. The 958-kilometre (595 mi) HSR corridor will connect Varanasi to Delhi through 13 stations along with a 123 km long spur connecting Lucknow and Ayodhya.

== Cost ==
The Delhi Varanasi high speed rail corridor will cost around ₹1.71 lakh crore (US$18 billion).

== Stations ==
Delhi-Varanasi high speed rail corridor will have 13 stations. Proposed stations are Delhi, Noida, Jewar Airport, Mathura, Agra, Firozabad, Etawah, South Kannauj, Lucknow, Ayodhya, Raebareli, Prayagraj, Pratapgarh, New Bhadohi and Varanasi.

== Project status ==
=== 2017 ===
- December: A consortium of INECO, TYPSA and ICT had submitted the project feasibility project report of the proposed Delhi-Varanasi High Speed Rail Corridor.

=== 2019 ===
- December: Ministry of Railways had given the task to National High Speed Rail Corporation Ltd (NHSRCL) for preparing the detailed project report (DPR).

=== 2020 ===
- February: NHSRCL had started floating tenders for various activities including design and survey of the project.

=== 2021 ===
- January: LiDAR survey for Delhi Varanasi bullet train project was initiated.
- August: Detailed Project Report (DPR) which was expected to be submitted by this month, was then announced to be submitted in the month of September. A new spur line linking Ayodhya was also proposed.
- November: Indian Railways received the Detailed Project Report (DPR) from NHSRCL which included multiple studies on expected ridership, impact on surrounding villages, land requirement, social impact assessment and effect on the environment.

=== 2022 ===
- July: NHSRCL had finalised the overall route and stations of the project.
- August: The railway ministry rejected the reports that reported shelving of the project. The ministry in fact mentioned that it had no issues regarding the DPR of the project. It was earlier reported that to reduce costs of land acquisition, the project would run through National Highway 2 which had many curves that put the project in question. Since the train runs at 350 kmph, the alignment must be relatively straight with minimal degrees of curves.

== See also ==
- High-speed rail in India
  - List of high-speed railway lines in India
  - Varanasi–Howrah high-speed rail corridor
  - Mumbai–Ahmedabad high-speed rail corridor
  - Chennai-Bengaluru-Mysuru high-speed rail corridor
  - Diamond Quadrilateral
  - National High Speed Rail Corporation Limited
- Vande Bharat Express
