= National High Speed Rail Corporation Limited =

Indian government organisation

National High Speed Rail Corporation Limited (NHSRCL)
- Type: Subsidiary of Indian Railways
- Industry: High-speed rail
- Founded: 12 February 2016; 10 years ago
- Founder: Ministry of Railways
- Headquarters: Sector-9, Dwarka, Delhi
- Key people: Mr. Satish Kumar (Chairman); Vivek Kumar Gupta (Managing Director)
- Revenue: ▲₹12,765.55 crore (US$1.4 billion) (2024)
- Operating income: ▲₹127.65 crore (US$14 million) (2024)
- Net income: ▲₹80.15 crore (US$8.6 million) (2024)
- Total assets: ▲₹61,184.06 crore (US$6.5 billion) (2024)
- Total equity: ▲₹15,319.09 crore (US$1.6 billion) (2024)
- Owner: Indian Railways, Ministry of Railways, Government of India
- Number of employees: 389 (March 2024)
- Website: nhsrcl.in

The National High Speed Rail Corporation Limited (NHSRCL) is the national public sector undertaking incorporated in 2016 to manage high-speed rail corridors in India. It is a wholly owned subsidiary of the Ministry of Railways.

NHSRCL was formed under the Companies Act. The objective of this body is the development and implementation of high-speed rail projects in India. The corporation is a 'special purpose vehicle' (SPV) in the joint sector with equity participation of the Ministry of Railways, Government of India and two State Governments – Gujarat and Maharashtra.

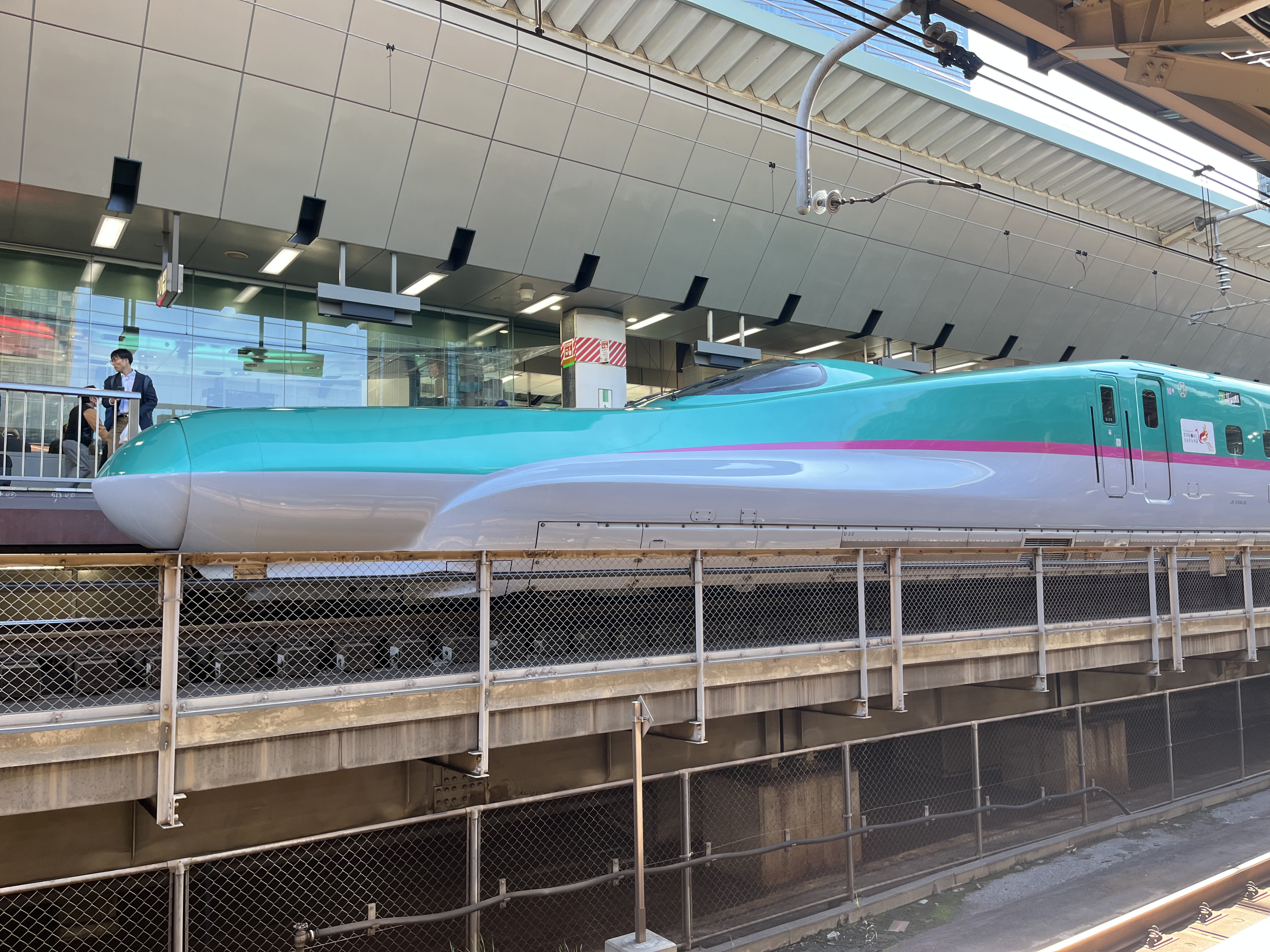
E5 Series train set as Tohuku Shinkansen at Tokyo Station.

== Headquarters ==
The company, with approximately 4,500 employees, has its headquarters situated at 5th to 7th Floors, Tower D, World Trade Centre, Nauroji Nagar, New Delhi - 110029

== Projects ==
The NHSRCL is currently managing the planning and construction of twelve high-speed rail corridors. A total of eight of the proposals have been approved, with one currently under construction. Once the corridors have been completed, NHSRCL will further extend the lines to form a network of high-speed rail connectivity in India, which is also known as the Diamond Quadrilateral.

The E5 Series trains with red and grey livery have been chosen for use on the under-construction ₹1.08 lakh crore (US$12 billion) Mumbai–Ahmedabad high-speed rail corridor in India, scheduled to open in June-July 2026. A total of 24 trains are planned to be purchased while the deal for the first six is intended to be signed by the end of March 2024.

Hitachi and Kawasaki Heavy Industries started talks with Indian Railways on design changes such as the modification of the air conditioning system in order for it to operate efficiently at temperatures up to 50 degrees Celsius. One of the goal of Indian Railways is to replace the high-end technical offerings on Japan's train sets with indigenous bio-toilets. Similarly, the primary languages for documentation of facility usage instructions must be Hindi and English.

A thorough technical study was commissioned by National High Speed Rail Corporation Limited with HKC Consortium in Japan. The goal was to determine the adjustments needed for the rolling stock to run efficiently under Indian climatic conditions. The existing HVAC systems are usually sufficient, but a few minor layout adjustments are needed to maximize performance. To control dust levels, filter cleaning frequency must increase. The heavier weight of the cooling equipment was a hurdle throughout the redesign phase since it could affect energy efficiency. The power needed to maintain high speeds rises with weight, which may have an impact on the train's overall performance. To make matters more complicated, Indian passengers' average weight, including their luggage, is higher than that of Japanese passengers. A weight calculation analysis showed that simply providing fewer seats, the Shinkansen in India could keep its weight similar to that of Japan.

=== Mumbai–Ahmedabad HSR ===
It is the first high-speed rail corridor to be implemented in India, with technical and financial assistance from Japan, with a total of twelve stations in the states of Maharashtra, Gujarat and union territory of Dadra and Nagar Haveli. The high-speed rail corridor will have a length of 508.17 km with 155.76 km in the state of Maharashtra (7.04 km in sub-urban Mumbai, 39.66 km in Thane district & 109.06 km in Palghar district), 4.3 km in union territory of Dadra & Nagar Haveli and 348.04 km in the state of Gujarat.

The high-speed rail corridor will cover a total of 12 stations namely Mumbai, Thane, Virar and Boisar (in Maharashtra), Vapi, Bilimora, Surat, Bharuch, Vadodara, Anand, Ahmedabad and Sabarmati (in Gujarat). A limited-stop (in Surat & Vadodara) service of the high-speed rail corridor will cover the route in 1 h 58 mins, and the all-stops service will take 2 h 57 mins.

=== Delhi–Ahmedabad HSR ===
The detailed project report (DPR) of the Delhi–Ahmedabad high-speed rail corridor has been prepared and this corridor is waiting for approval and land acquisition to start.

=== Delhi–Varanasi HSR ===
The Delhi-Varanasi high-speed rail corridor is India's second high-speed line project after the Mumbai-Ahmedabad high-speed rail corridor. The 865 km HSR corridor will connect Varanasi to the NCR through 12 stations.

=== Varanasi–Howrah HSR ===
The detailed project report (DPR) of the Varanasi–Howrah high-speed rail corridor is being prepared.

=== Chennai–Bengaluru HSR ===
It will be the first high-speed rail corridor in the southern part of India.

=== Mumbai–Nagpur HSR ===
The detailed project report (DPR) of Mumbai–Nagpur high-speed rail corridor is being prepared.

== See also ==
- Dedicated Freight Corridor Corporation of India
- National Capital Region Transport Corporation
- High-speed rail in India
- Urban rail transit in India
