= Proposed high-speed rail by country =

This is a list of planned, or proposed, high-speed rail projects by country. Although a number of countries have conducted preliminary feasibility studies, many lines are eventually shelved or postponed due to high costs; only a few nations are building high-speed rail lines. Planned (or proposed) lines are separated here from lines under construction, and some countries have both. High-speed rail is public transport by rail at speeds over 200 km/h (125 mph).

== Africa ==
=== Integrated network ===
The planned African integrated high-speed rail network, part of the African Union's Vision 2063 project. Accelerated pilot projects and a few pilot projects reached the planning phase in 2022.

In 2013, the African Union (AU) passed Agenda 2063: a 50-year development trajectory which includes a continental free trade zone, a common passport, an end to armed conflict, an annual African economic forum, a space program, a Great African Museum, establishment of e-universities, and a high-speed rail network. Africa has the lowest rail density of any inhabited continents, with 16 countries lacking rail altogether (especially in Central Africa); most rail lines are single-track freight lines operating at 30|km/h, traveling from ports to industrial zones such as mines and forests.

The AU signed a memorandum of understanding with China in 2014 for the 30– to 50-year development of a continental rail system connecting all African capitals with modern rail technology, facilitating interoperability by using one gauge instead of the current nine. The network's goal is to facilitate intra-African trade and lower shipping costs. Its initial timeline for 2022 was the completion of preparatory work; only 12.3 percent of the network was studied, however, largely due to funding constraints. Completed pre-feasibility studies include the 2,891-kilometre (1,796 mi) Cotonou-Niamey-Ouagadougou-Abidjan Railway, which would cost US$5.022 billion to build and rehabilitate and US$866 million to equip. The Djibouti-Libreville corridor was estimated to be 2,366 kilometres (1,470 mi) long and cost $5.277 billion, and the Dakar-N'Djamena-Djibouti corridor was estimated to be 5,139 kilometres (3,193 mi) in length and cost $14.05 billion. It has not yet been specified which rail lines would operate at 330 km/h (205 mph), 250 km/h (155 mph), or 160 km/h (100 mph).

A master plan for 2033 envisions 35,828 kilometres (22,262 mi) of rail construction with the following projects. The first three are accelerated pilot projects under study or construction. The objectives by 2033 are to connect 16 landlocked countries to seaports and connect regions with trans-Africa corridors. The 2043 master plan would expand the network to connect Africa's political and economic capitals by rail.

- Accelerated pilot projects:
  - Kigali-Dar Es Salaam: 1,476 km (917 mi)
  - Kampala-Bujumbura: 596 km (370 mi)
  - Walvis Bay-Windhoek-Gaborone-Johannesburg: 1,643 km (1,021 mi)
- 2033 master plan:
  - Nairobi-Mombasa: 459 km (285 mi)
  - Bamako-Ouagadougou-Niamey-N'Djamena-Khartoum: 5,384 km (3,345 mi)
  - Addis Ababa-Djibouti: 637 km (396 mi)
  - Pointe Noire-Brazzaville-Kinshasa-Bujumbura: 1,755 km (1,091 mi)
  - Johannesburg-Maputo: 524 km (326 mi)
  - Pretoria-Durban: 626 km (389 mi)
  - Algiers-Abuja-Lagos: 4,111 km (2,554 mi)
  - Lobito-Lusaka: 2,253 km (1,400 mi)
  - N'Djamena-Bangui-Brazzaville-Luanda: 2,240 km (1,390 mi)
  - Addis Ababa-Nairobi-Dodoma-Lusaka-Gaborone: 4,812 km (2,990 mi)
  - Khartoum-Addis Ababa
  - Luanda-Windhoek: 1,882 km (1,169 mi)
  - Mbeya-Lilongwe-Harare-Johannesburg-Maseru: 3,115 km (1,936 mi)
  - Lilongwe-Nacala: 815 km (506 mi)
  - Lamu-Juba: 1,547 km (961 mi)
  - Bangui-Juba: 1,551 km (964 mi)
  - Juba-Kampala: 672 km (418 mi)
- 2033 pilot projects:
  - Tunis-Algiers-Casablanca: 1,981 km (1,231 mi)
  - Douala-Bangui
  - Kampala-Nairobi
  - Dakar-Bamako 1,147 km (713 mi)
  - Asmara-Addis Ababa: 771 km (479 mi)
  - Lusaka-Beira
  - Alexandria-Khartoum
  - Ouagadougou-Abidjan: 1,120 km (700 mi)
  - Niamey-Cotonou: 955 km (593 mi)
- 2043 master plan:
  - Alexandria-Benghazi-Tripoli-Tunis: 2,770 km (1,720 mi)
  - Casablanca-Laayoune-Nouakchott-Dakar: 2,733 km (1,698 mi)
  - Dakar-Banjul-Conakry-Monrovia-Abidjan-Accra-Lagos-Douala: 7,595 km (4,719 mi)
  - Yaoundé-Bata-Libreville: 594 km (369 mi)
  - Mogadishu-Addis Ababa
  - Windhoek-Cape Town: 1,632 km (1,014 mi)
  - Maseru-Cape Town: 1,135 km (705 mi)
  - Tripoli-N'Djamena: 2,437 km (1,514 mi)

=== Algeria ===
In 2012, ANESRIF began building a double-track 142-kilometre (88 mi) electric high-speed railway reaching speeds of 220 kilometres per hour (140 mph) from Oued Tlélat (Oran) with stops in Sidi Bel-Abbès and Tlemcen. It was 80-percent completed by 2021, with 129 viaducts totaling 14 kilometres (8.7 mi) and three tunnels totaling 1.5 kilometres (0.93 mi). The project was scheduled for completion in 2019, but faced delays due to problems with land acquisition and COVID-19 and was scheduled to open by the end of 2021. The administration began work on an extension from Tlemcen to Akkid Abbas (Maghnia) on the Moroccan border in 2015, a total of 56 kilometres (35 mi) designed for speeds of 220 kilometres per hour (140 mph). It was only seven percent completed by fall 2021, largely due to land-acquisition controversies in Tlemcen and Mansourah. This section will contain Africa's largest viaduct: the 130-metre-high (430 ft), 1.8-kilometre-long (1.1 mi) M'dig Viaduct over the Isser River (near Aïn Fezza), with a 600-metre (2,000 ft) tunnel into downtown Tlemcen and a renovated train station. The 198-kilometre (123 mi) project is estimated to cost €2 billion.

=== Egypt ===
Planned high-speed rail lines in Egypt in May 2022. The first segment is under construction, with a completion date of 2027. The second segment has been extended to the Western Desert, and has begun construction with no announced end date. Construction of the third segment is planned, and further lines have been proposed.

On 12 March 2018, Egyptian Transport Minister Hisham Arafat said that Egypt was in the process of launching a new high-speed railway linking the Mediterranean and the Red Sea in partnership with more than 10 international companies. In September 2020, a Chinese-Egyptian consortium consisting of the China Civil Engineering Construction Corporation, the Egyptian Samcrete and the Arab Organization for Industrialization received US$9 billion to build a 543-kilometre-long (337 mi) high-speed railway capable of top speeds of 250 kilometres per hour (160 mph). The electric-powered trains would be manufactured in Port Said with a Chinese technology transfer to Egypt.

The first 660 kilometres (410 mi) was planned to begin in Mersa Matruh on the Mediterranean Sea and pass through Al-Alamein, Borg El Arab, Wadi El Natroun and 6th of October through southern Cairo to the New Administrative Capital, ending in Ain Sokhna on the Red Sea's Gulf of Suez. Surveying and route planning were completed and construction began on bridges and track by January 2021. This initial segment, intended for passengers and freight, is projected to cost $3 billion and has a completion date of 2023. On 14 January 2021, a memorandum of understanding was signed between Siemens Mobility and the Transportation Ministry's National Authority of Tunnels to design, install, and maintain Egypt's first high-speed rail system. A second line between Alexandria and Borg El Arab was included in the contract, and both were under construction in 2022. The Siemens-led consortium received a $4.5 billion contract to build the lines from Ain Sokhna to Marsa Matruh and to Alexandria in September 2021, which are scheduled for completion in 2027. The lines will use Velaro high-speed passenger trains. The 660-kilometre (410 mi) segment will be designed to carry up to 30 million passengers annually, cut travel times in half, and reduce carbon emissions by 70 percent. In February 2023, the French construction company NGE signed a contract to build 330 kilometres (210 mi) of the line between Ain Sokhna and Borg El Arab with 100 turnouts.

A second line will run from the city of 6 October through Fayoum, Minya, Aswan, and Abu Simbel over 1,100 kilometres (680 mi) along the west bank of the Nile. Local stations will include Al-Ayat, Al-Fashn, Al-Adwa, Bani Mazar, Samalout, Abu Qurqas, Mallawi, and Dayrout. Survey and construction work for the line began in March 2022 by Egyptian authorities, focusing on the area around 6 October and Fayoum, with an anticipated design speed of 250 kilometres per hour (160 mph) and preliminary operation of express trains at 230 kilometres per hour (140 mph). An extension of the line was announced in May 2022 from Aswan through Abu Simbel to Toshka and Sharq El Owainat in the Western Desert, as well as an extension to Wadi Halfa in Sudan. The Kuwait Fund for Arab Economic Development signed a $2.45 million feasibility study for a 283.5-kilometre (176.2 mi) line from Aswan to Toshka and Abu Simbel, as well as an 80-kilometre (50 mi) extension to Sudan which includes a 6-kilometre (3.7 mi) bridge across Lake Nasser. In early 2023, the Transport Ministry said that President Abdel Fattah al-Sisi approved the extension from Aswan to Abu Simbel with five high-speed rail stations and seven regional stations planned between Luxor and Abu Simbel.

A third line is planned in the south from Safaga through Sahl Hasheesh, Hurghada, East Sohag, Qena, and Qus to Luxor at a total cost of $2.7 billion, with a construction time of two years. Contracts for the second and third lines were planned to be signed by Siemens in March 2022; the €8.1 billion contract was signed on May 31, 2022, between the Egyptian government and Siemens (and its consortium partners Orascom Construction and Arab Contractors), and includes construction of the second and third lines, 41 Velaro eight-car high-speed passenger trains, 94 Desiro high-capacity four-car regional trainsets, 41 Vectron freight locomotives, a level-2 European Train Control System and a suitable power grid. The network is projected to cost $23 billion and span over 2,000 kilometres (1,200 mi).

A planned extension eastwards from Marsa Matruh through El Negaila to Sallum on the Libyan border to Benghazi in Libya was announced by Egyptian Transport Minister Kamel Al-Wazir in November 2020, and was confirmed by the Libyan-Egyptian Chamber of Commerce on 18 January 2021. An extension to Siwa was also cited. Al-Wazir reiterated the Egyptian government's commitment to future extensions to Wadi Halfa in Sudan and Benghazi in Libya in March 2023 at the World High Speed Rail Conference in Marrakesh. This is part of the Egyptian government's larger plan to build political and economic links with Libya and Sudan, including Wadi Halfa.

=== Libya ===
Before the 2011 Libyan Revolution, the government of Muammar Gaddafi was building a high-speed rail line capable of 200-kilometre-per-hour (120 mph) operation from the Tunisian border to the Egyptian border at a total cost of $7.9 billion. Russian Railways had received the $2.9 billion contract for the section between Sirte and Benghazi, with an anticipated completion in 2012; at least 14 kilometres (8.7 mi) of the planned 554-kilometre (344 mi) line was laid. China Railway had been working on a $2.6 billion link between Sirte and Khums, with plans for extension westwards to Tripoli. In 2010, the Libyan government proposed a feasibility study for a $2 billion high-speed rail line between Benghazi and Tobruk which was expected to be completed by 2012. Trains were to run on diesel fuel, with electrification planned. Dorsch Afrique was also involved in designing a 150-kilometre (93 mi) high-speed connection between Tobruk and Umm Saad, on the Egyptian border. Three kilometers of high-speed track were finished, including a station in Tripoli and one kilometer of tunnels, and 30 kilometers had been cleared in 2003. The rail line's steel, however, was plundered during the civil war.

The Libyan government has tried to resume the project several times. In 2015, Prime Minister Abdullah al-Thinni visited Moscow and set up a review commission. The Libyan government approached Russia in 2018 to resume construction on the Sirte-Benghazi line, and Russian Railways responded that Tripoli would have to compensate the company for costs incurred after the project was halted in 2011. In January 2021, the Egyptian government announced plans to extend its proposed high-speed link from Alamein through El Salloum to Benghazi.

=== Morocco ===
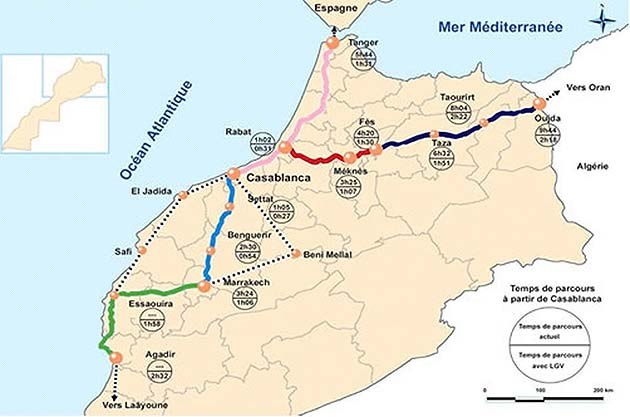
Planned 2040 Moroccan high-speed rail program

A trans-Maghreb high-speed rail line linking Morocco, Algeria, and Tunisia is planned. The project is expected to begin in Morocco, move towards Algiers, and reach Tunis. However, historical relations between Morocco and Algeria have delayed the project. Part of the line opened by November 2018, and Al Boraq (between Casablanca and Tangier) is Africa's second high-speed rail line, after the Gautrain in linking Pretoria with Sandton in South Africa.

By 2040, Morocco plans to build a route from Kenitra to Marrakech for 40 billion MAD (USD$4 billion) to upgrade the current Kenitra-Casablanca segment to high-speed, and to build a route from Marrakech to Agadir for 50 billion MAD (USD$5 billion). China Railway expressed interest in the latter project to the Moroccan government in the summer of 2021. In March 2022, after completion of design studies for the Marrakech-Agadir project, a Korea National Railway-led consortium secured a $32 billion contract with ONCF (Moroccan National Railways) for section three of the planned 230-kilometre (140 mi) line. In April 2024, Morocco announced the issuance of a tender for the construction of the 375 km high-speed railway between Kenitra and Marrakech. In August 2024, the contract for the line to Marrakech was awarded to the French Egis Group with a planned opening of 2029.

ONCF has announced plans to build high-speed rail between Rabat-Fez-Oujda, on the Algerian border, by 2040. With initial feasibility studies completed, the company announced in July 2022 that the first section (Rabat-Khemisset-Meknes) had begun environmental and social review spurred by the success of the sections between Tangier and Casablanca.

Further extensions from Tangier north across the Strait of Gibraltar to Algeciras in Spain have been discussed intermittently since the 1930s. In the summer of 2023, the Spanish government pledged €2.3 million for a design study in a joint commission with Morocco. In spring 2024, the project was deemed feasible within a timeline of five years, with a travel time from Madrid to Casablanca of 5.5 hours.

=== Namibia ===
In 2020, the Namibian government undertook a detailed feasibility and design study for a line between the port in Walvis Bay through Windhoek to Gaborone, Botswana, and Pretoria, South Africa as part of the African Union's Agenda 2063. Construction was scheduled to begin in 2023.

=== South Africa ===
On 7 June 2010, Minister of Transport Sbusiso Ndebele said that plans were being considered for a high-speed line from Johannesburg to Durban. The line would reduce travel time from 12 hours to about three. The 721-kilometre (448 mi) line would involve engineering challenges, including traversing the Drakensberg mountains. A high-speed line from Johannesburg to Cape Town is also being studied. The $30 billion plan was discussed with China Railway Group, which wanted South Africa to contribute 40 percent of the capital; South Africa was hoping that Chinese banks would provide a loan for the project. In 2020, South Africa's Department of Transport announced plans to establish a high-speed rail network by 2025 between Pretoria, Johannesburg, and Durban. The freight corridor was affirmed in Parliament in July 2021; the Chinese ambassador to South Africa confirmed in April 2022 that their country intended to collaborate in a passenger and freight rail link between Johannesburg and Durban, but funding would be uncertain. In fall 2022, South African President Cyril Ramaphosa outlined a National Rail Act to finance feasibility studies. In August 2024, Gauteng Premier Panyaza Lesufi confirmed that a feasibility study has begun for a high-speed train connection between Gauteng province and the Limpopo province. In July 2025, the first phase of the project will focus on a section between Pretoria and Polokwane, the capital city of Limpopo province to launch South Africa’s first rail network for long-distance high-speed rail, The construction on the 500-kilometre (310 mi) north-south railway is expected to start in late 2026, with the first bullet trains on the network operational by 2030.

=== Sudan ===
A 250-kilometre-per-hour (160 mph) rail link from the Egyptian city of Aswan to Wadi Halfa in northern Sudan has been proposed, and a $2.5 million feasibility study was agreed with Kuwaiti investors in April 2022. A standard-gauge extension from Halfa to Khartoum has been proposed to connect travelers with Alexandria.

=== Tunisia ===
The Tunisian government and Tunisian Railways (SNCFT) are planning high-speed rail in three parts; the first is a 180-kilometre (110 mi) line from Ras Jedir on the Libyan border to Gabès, built to 250 kilometres per hour (160 mph) for passenger trains and 120 kilometres per hour (75 mph) for freight at an estimated cost of TND 2.6 billion ($917 million). The second phase will continue from Gabès through Sfax, Sousse, Nabeul, and Tunis to Bizerte, a 480-kilometre (300 mi) segment which will involve new track and upgrading existing lines for an estimated TND 14 billion ($4.9 billion). The third phase will involve an upgrade of the line between Tunis and Tabarka on the Algerian border, a 180-kilometre (110 mi) segment with an estimated cost of TND 9.4 billion ($3.3 billion). The total cost of the 840-kilometre (520 mi) electrified standard-gauge line was estimated by the Tunisian government at TND 26 billion ($9.2 billion) in the fall of 2021. No action seems to have been taken other than initiating discussion of a partnership by Tunisian president Kaïs Saïed and French president Emmanuel Macron on 22 June 2020. In June 2021, Saïed attempted to secure a loan from the European Investment Bank to finance the project. It was refused, since the country had borrowed 7 billion TND ($2.3 billion) during the previous decade; the bank suggested upgrading existing rail infrastructure instead.

== Americas ==
=== Argentina ===
A Buenos Aires–Rosario–Córdoba high-speed railway was planned, operating at speeds of 320 km/h (200 mph). Construction was scheduled to begin in 2008 and was expected to be finished in 2012, but the project is currently on hold. It would join Buenos Aires, Rosario, and Córdoba. Other projected high-speed rail lines include:

- Buenos Aires-Mar del Plata (400 km [250 mi]): A line to the seaside beach-resort city and fishing port of Mar del Plata, 400 km (250 mi) south of Buenos Aires
- Buenos Aires-Mendoza: 1,200 km (750 mi)

=== Brazil ===
Rio-São Paulo High Speed Rail (Portuguese: Trem de Alta Velocidade Rio-São Paulo, abbreviated TAV RJ-SP) was proposed to connect Brazil's two largest metropolises (São Paulo and Rio de Janeiro) with an extension to Campinas, another municipality near São Paulo, and a 100-kilometre (62 mi) radius. The proposed route, across some of Brazil's most mountainous and urbanized terrain, required about 40 percent of its tracks to be built through viaducts, bridges and tunnels. The proposed project was expected to cost US$16 billion. Brazil proposed the following routes:

- Brasília – Goiânia – Rio Verde – Itumbiara – Uberlândia – Uberaba – Ribeirão Preto – Campinas – São Paulo – Rio de Janeiro: 1,200 kilometres (750 mi)
- Belo Horizonte – São Paulo: 594 kilometres (369 mi)
- Curitiba – São Paulo: 410 kilometres (250 mi)
- Santos – São Paulo: 80 kilometres (50 mi)
- Brasília – Goiânia: 200 kilometres (120 mi)

The country uses standard gauge, 1,435 mm (4 ft 8 1/2 in). The proposed commercial speed was 350 kilometres per hour (220 mph). Stations included Rio de Janeiro Centre, Rio de Janeiro Intl Airport, Volta Redonda/Barra Mansa, São José dos Campos, São Paulo/Guarulhos Intl Airport, São Paulo Centre, São Paulo/Viracopos Intl Airport and Campinas Centre. The project was later cancelled for economic reasons.

=== Canada ===
Two routes have been frequently proposed as suitable for a high-speed rail corridor:

- Edmonton to Calgary via Red Deer
- Windsor to Quebec City via London, Toronto, Ottawa, and Montreal

A possible international high-speed rail link between Montreal and Boston or New York City is often discussed by regional leaders, although little progress has been made. Work is underway to improve the Amtrak Cascades service between Vancouver and Seattle, but the line will not reach speeds normally associated with high-speed rail. In Ontario, the Progressive Conservative government elected in 2018 postponed a decision on high-speed lines.

There has been some progress since then. A new project called Alto (high-speed rail) plans to link Toronto to Québec City with high speed rail. As of March 2026, the alignment is still in planning pending public comments. Officials at Alto expect this to take 4 years.

=== Chile ===
A high-speed 200-kilometre-per-hour (120 mph) rail connection between Santiago and Valparaíso was first proposed in 2018 by China Railway Group and the following year by Spanish-based Formento de Construccions y Contratas (FCC) and Talgo, via an alternate route through Limache and Tiltil. The project, initially planned to open in 2024, was suspended in 2021 because of the COVID-19 pandemic. Either plan would cost $2 billion to $4 billion, which Empresa de los Ferrocarriles del Estado (EFE) head Pedro Pablo Errazuriz said was too expensive to prioritize in 2022. In May 2022, however, President Gabriel Boric's administration reiterated that the project is a priority for the government and called for proposals by mid-year.

=== Colombia ===
The Colombian National Agency of Infrastructure (ANI) was interested in building a high-speed rail link as part of Colombia's 4G modernization. The transport minister had said that plans and studies for a bullet train would begin in 2015. However, Colombia has the smallest train ridership of any large Latin American nation. There have been many proposals since the 1990s, when Japanese firms wanted to build a bullet-train network from Bogota to nearby cities, but the project was cancelled.

=== Mexico ===
Mexico's Secretariat of Communications and Transport originally proposed a high-speed rail link which would transport passengers from Mexico City to Guadalajara, Jalisco, with stops Querétaro, Guanajuato, Leon and Irapuato and a connected line from the port city of Manzanillo to Aguascalientes. The train, which would travel at 300 kilometres per hour (190 mph), would enable passengers to travel from Mexico City to Guadalajara in two hours. The network was planned to connect to Monterrey, Chilpancingo, Cuernavaca, Toluca, Puebla, Tijuana, Hermosillo, Cordoba, Veracruz, Oaxaca, Colima, Zacatecas, Torreon, Chihuahua, Puebla, San Luis Potosi, Mexicali Saltillo and Acapulco by 2015, but no progress had been made by 2020. The project was projected to cost MXN$240, or about USD$25 billion. In 2005, Mexican billionaire Carlos Helú expressed interest in investing in high-speed rail. The Yucatan Peninsula has been studied for the development of high-speed rail, with the Transpeninsular Fast Train available for bidding in September 2011.

By 2014, the route for the first phase of the Mexico City-Guadalajara HST had been selected. It would operate from the Buenavista station in Mexico City to Querétaro, a length of 212 kilometres (132 mi). The HST would first extend to Guadalajara; after the first stage, it would extend to Celaya, Salamanca, Irapuato, and Leon. The first phase was expected to be completed by 2018.

Latin America's first high-speed line had been announced in July 2014 with the opening of an international tender to build a passenger train linking Mexico City and Querétaro at up to 300 kilometres per hour (190 mph), moving 23,000 passengers a day. The line would extend over 210 kilometres (130 mi), with construction beginning that year, and operation beginning in the second half of 2017.

On 6 November 2014, Mexico's president announced that the proposed bullet train was being postponed because there was only one bidder. Falling oil prices and the economic downturn delayed the project. Mexican President Andrés Manuel López Obrador revived the project in July 2018, and in 2020 the Mexican government secured a MXN$51.3 billion investment (US$2.3 billion) to fund it. Eighty million pesos (US$3.93 million) had been allocated for initial feasibility studies by 2022, with the remaining funds planned through 2025.

In 2021, Mexican rail officials began a US$2 million feasibility study for a rail connection between San Antonio, Texas, and Monterrey, Mexico; unlike previous US$20 billion proposals for a line to be built for 250-mph (400-km/h) operation, the US$7 billion proposal examines a 100-mph (160-km/h) route taking four hours.

=== Panama ===
China approached the Panamanian government in 2019 with a feasibility plan for a 391-kilometer (243-mile) high-speed line from Panama City to David, on the Costa Rican border. The line would have been partially financed under China's Belt and Road Initiative. The project was declined by Panamanian president Laurentino Cortizo in September of that year, who said that it would be a debt overload.

=== United States ===
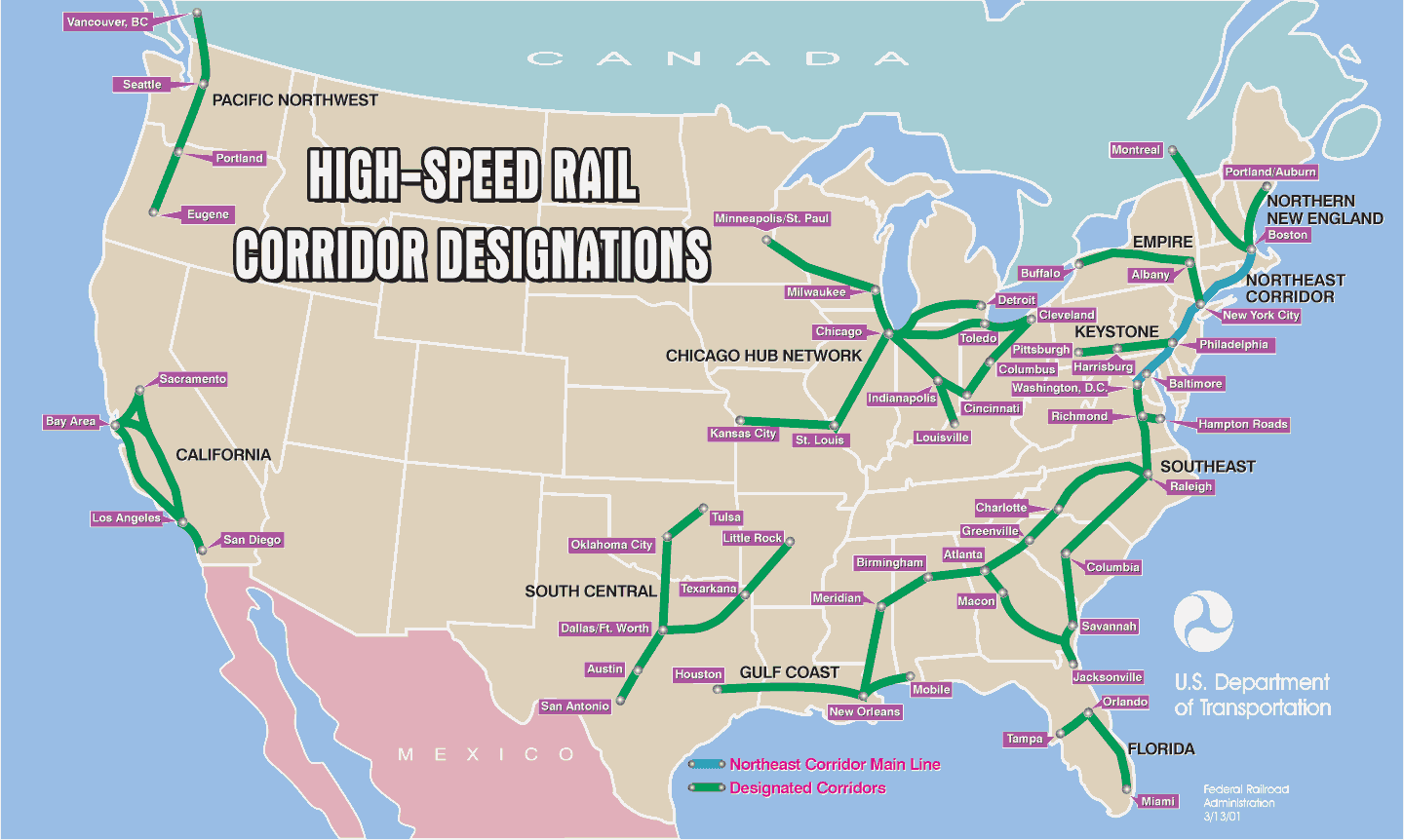
Proposed high-speed routes in the U.S. in 2001

High-speed rail service in the United States, notably the Acela Express, is limited to the Northeast Corridor. Amtrak uses the Acela Express as a high-speed service between Washington, D.C., and Boston via New York City and Philadelphia along the Northeast Corridor (NEC). Its tilting design allows the train to travel at higher speeds on the sharply curved NEC without disturbing passengers. The Northeast Regional follows the same route, with more stops. All other high-speed rail services share part of the route.

There has been a resurgence of interest outside the Northeast Corridor in recent decades, with plans for high-speed rail across the country. The Texas High Speed Rail and Transportation Corporation (THSRTC), a grass-roots organization dedicated to bringing high-speed rail to Texas, was established in 2002. In 2006, American Airlines and Continental Airlines joined THSRTC in an effort to bring high-speed rail to Texas as a passenger-collector system for the airlines. Lone Star High-Speed Rail was formed in 2009 to plan a railway between Dallas and Houston. The company changed its name to Texas Central Railway in 2013, and has been developing a system based on technology used on Japanese Shinkansen lines. The 240-mile (390 km) route traverses open farms and ranches, with one stop in the Brazos Valley. Regulatory approvals were received in September 2020,

The California High-Speed Rail Authority was created in 1996 to implement an 800-mile (1,300 km) rail system which is estimated to cost about $40 billion. The system will not require operating subsidies, and is expected to generate $1 billion in annual profits. Construction was approved with the passage of Proposition 1A, authorizing a $9.95 billion general obligation bond. The system would provide high-speed service between major cities such as Sacramento, San Francisco, Fresno, Los Angeles, and San Diego, and would allow travel between Los Angeles' Union Station and San Francisco Transbay Terminal in two-and-a-half hours. On 2 December 2010, the California High-Speed Rail Authority announced that the first section of the Californian high-speed rail network had been selected and construction was to start in 2012, but delays postponed it to 2015. The line will run from near Madera south to Bakersfield, with stations at Fresno and Hanford, for 105 kilometres (65 mi) through a rural portion of the San Joaquin Valley. It will connect with conventional Amtrak lines at each end. In December 2010, its funding was doubled after the newly elected governors of Ohio and Wisconsin decided to cancel right-of-way projects which had been allocated $1.2 billion by the federal government. Of that amount, $616 million was granted to California in addition to funding already promised; this, combined with a state bond issue to match the new funding, provided over $1.2 billion in additional funding. It will be used to add an additional 88 kilometres (55 mi) of track, bringing the line to the edge of Bakersfield. Brightline West, a project of Fortress Investment Group, is a planned line between Los Angeles, and Las Vegas with speeds up to 200 miles per hour (320 km/h). Begun as an independent venture in 2005, the project changed hands several times before its acquisition by Brightline (who had recently begun its initial Florida route). Construction is expected to start in 2023, with service beginning in 2027.

In September 2010, Amtrak announced proposals for 355 km/h (221 mph) trains to run between Washington, D.C., and Boston via Baltimore, Philadelphia, and New York. End-to-end travel time would be three hours. The proposals would cost $117 billion, and would take 30 years to complete. Amtrak estimates that extra capacity would be needed, since the Acela trains would be full by 2030. The proposal envisages completion by 2040.

== Asia ==
=== Bangladesh ===
Bangladesh considered building a high-speed rail link between Dhaka and Chittagong in 2005. The government short-listed France's SNCF and Japan Railways for the project, which was ultimately abandoned. In 2014, Spain and China were interested in developing the Bangladesh Railway into a high-speed network. Seven years later, Chinese ambassador Li Jiming said that China was interested in investing in the line's construction. In March 2022, Russian-based RZD International approached Bangladesh Railway about financing the project after feasibility and design studies had been completed; the 225-kilometre (140 mi) route would cost an estimated $11.1 billion. Chinese ambassador to Bangladesh Li Jiming wrote to Railways Minister Nurul Islam Sujan in June 2022 about signing a memorandum of understanding between China Railway Group and Bangladesh Railways under a government-to-government public–private partnership.

Ninety percent of the country's trade passes through Chittagong and 80 percent of its exports are carried on the Dhaka-Chattogram highway, incentivizing the creation of a freight rail line. A 300-kilometre-per-hour (190 mph) passenger journey would take 55 minutes – 75 minutes with stops in Narayanganj, Comilla, and Feni; the current travel time is six hours. In February 2023, Whip Iqbalur Rahim promised a bullet train between Dinajpur and Dhaka by 2027 if the Awami League agreed.

=== Cambodia ===
Planned high speed rail by Cambodia in 2023

Cambodian Prime Minister Hun Sen confirmed in December 2021 that his government was interested in high-speed-rail, with a feasibility study for upgrading the 266-kilometre (165 mi) line from Phnom Penh to Sihanoukville and the 386-kilometre (240 mi) line to Poipet. Sen indicated an intent to build new rail lines by continuing from Poipet through Siem Reap to Kampong Thom, and building a line from Phnom Penh to Bavet on the Vietnamese border. The current railways can operate at only 20 to 30 kilometres per hour (12 to 19 mph), largely due to damage from the 1970s civil war. The line to Sihanoukville was rehabilitated in 2016; the line to Poipet was rehabilitated in 2018, and was reconnected with the Thai rail network across the border the following year. Cambodia's prime minister has tasked the Minister of Public Works and Transport with finding an international development partner. In early 2023, Sen traveled to China and signed a $44 million agreement (CN¥300 million) with CCP general secretary Xi Jinping, Chinese premier Li Keqiang and NPCSC chairman Li Zhanshu to upgrade the Phnom Penh-Poipet railway to 160-km/h operation after a China Road and Bridge Corporation (CRBC) feasibility study of the line; the project is estimated to cost a total of $4 billion. In July 2023, Minister of Public Works and Transport Sun Chanthol announced the start of a feasibility study to convert the Phnom Penh-Sihanoukville railway to higher-speed rail.

=== India ===
Map showing proposed high speed corridors

The Ministry of Railways of the Government of India has proposed to build 8,834.78 km (5,490 mi) of high-speed rail lines across fifteen corridors, with average operating speeds of up to 320 km/h (200 mph). Formation of the National High Speed Rail Authority (NHSRA) was announced in the 2012–2013 rail budget, although no firm date was set for construction. The Central Japan Railway Company has promoted a Shinkansen for India, and France has expressed interest in collaborating on long-term development of the Pune-Mumbai-Ahmedabad route. Spain's Talgo has also expressed interest in the projects, and plans to open an office in India to promote its technology.

In collaboration with Japan, India is building the Mumbai–Ahmedabad high-speed rail corridor (its first high-speed railway) on a 508 km-long (316 mi) route between Mumbai and the western city of Ahmedabad. On 12 December 2015, India and Japan signed a US$15 billion agreement to build a high-speed line between the cities in which Japan will provide a US$12 billion low-interest loan. The agreement was part of a memorandum of understanding involving the transfer of defense technology and civil nuclear cooperation. Preparatory work began in the third quarter of 2017, and was expected to be completed in December 2023. Due to slow land acquisition in Maharashtra and the COVID-19 pandemic, the expected date of completion for the portion from Surat to Bilimora in Gujarat has been postponed to 2026 and the entire corridor will be completed by October 2028. The National High Speed Rail Corporation (NHSRC) plans to operate E5 Series Shinkansen trains at speeds up to 320 km/h (200 mph). It is expected to cost about ₹1.1 trillion (equivalent to ₹1.7 trillion or US$17 billion in 2026), of which 81 percent is financed by the Japan International Cooperation Agency.

The Government of Kerala has proposed a high-speed rail corridor known as the Silver Line to carry freight and passengers from Kasargod in the north to Kerala's capital, Thiruvananthapuram, in the south. The 532 km (331 mi) project reduces the 12-hour travel time to less than four hours, with a maximum design speed of 220 km/h (140 mph); the current average speed is 45 kilometres per hour (28 mph). The project, estimated to be completed by 2025, is expected to cost ₹0.66 trillion (equivalent to ₹810 billion or US$8.4 billion in 2026). The Kerala government and the Union Ministry of Railways (as the Kerala Rail Development Corporation) plan intermediate stations in Kannur, Kozhikode, Tirur, Thrissur, Cochin Airport, Ernakulam, Kottayam, Chengannur, and Kollam. Of the 1,383 hectares (5.34 sq mi) required for the project, 1,198 hectares (4.63 sq mi) is private land; the project would displace 30,000 families. Other issues affecting the project include the planned standard gauge in a system which uses Indian gauge, low ridership estimates, hydrological problems, and stations distant from city centers. The project missed a mid-July 2022 deadline for completing its social-impact assessments (having consulted 45 out of 190 villages involved), leaving the project in legal limbo before the Kerala High Court. Railway Minister Ashwini Vaishnaw expressed doubt about the Silver Line project's feasibility on 29 July 2022.

A third high-speed rail project, between Delhi and Varanasi, is under construction and will cover 813 kilometres (505 mi) in less than four hours at a speed of 330 kilometres per hour (210 mph); the present travel time is 10 hours. The project is planned to have service at 22-minute intervals and thirteen stations, including Delhi (Kale Khan), Noida, Jewar Airport, Mathura, Agra, Etawah, South Kannauj, Lucknow, Ayodhya, Rae Bareli, Prayagraj, Bhadoi, Banaras and Varanasi, with a railway bridge over the Ganges River.

A fourth high-speed rail project proposed by the Karnataka government would run 485 kilometres (301 mi) from Mysuru (Mysore) through Bengaluru (Bangalore) to Chennai, cutting the current nine-hour travel time to three hours (45 minutes between Mysuru and Bengaluru) at a cost of ₹1.15 trillion (equivalent to ₹1.3 trillion or US$14 billion in 2026). By the summer of 2022, the state government had begun acquiring land for the right-of-way and is awaiting a memorandum of understanding with neighboring Tamil Nadu to facilitate land acquisition for the project.

High-speed rail lines in India
Corridor	Speed	Length	Gauge	Status	Year	Ref.
Mumbai–Ahmedabad	320 km/h (200 mph)	508.18 km (315.77 mi)	Standard	Under Construction	2028	
Chennai–Bengaluru	320 km/h (200 mph)	306 km (190 mi)	Standard	Approved	2032	
Hyderabad–Bengaluru	320 km/h (200 mph)	618 km (384 mi)	Standard	Approved	2031	
Mumbai–Hyderabad	350 km/h (220 mph)	671 km (417 mi)	Standard	Approved	2031	
Delhi–Varanasi (with a spur from Lucknow to Ayodhya)	320 km/h (200 mph)	865 km (537 mi) + 135 km (84 mi) spur to Ayodhya	Standard	Approved	2031	
Varanasi–Siliguri	300–350 km/h (190–220 mph)	1,705 km (1,059 mi)	Standard	Approved	TBD	
Chennai–Hyderabad	350 km/h (220 mph)	744.57 km (462.65 mi)	Standard	Announced in Budget 2026–27, DPR under preparation	TBD	
Varanasi–Kolkata	320 km/h (200 mph)	711 km (442 mi)	Standard	DPR under preparation	2031	
Siliguri-Guwahati	320 km/h (200 mph)	850 km (530 mi)	Standard	Varanasi-Siliguri corridor announced in Budget 2026–27 overlapping this corridor	2031	
Delhi–Ahmedabad	320 km/h (200 mph)	886 km (551 mi)	Standard	Awaiting Approval	2031	
Pune–Nashik	200 km/h (125 mph)	235.15 km (146.12 mi)	Standard	Awaiting Approval	TBD	
Mumbai–Nagpur	320 km/h (200 mph)	736 km (457 mi)	Standard	Awaiting Approval	2051	
Thiruvananthapuram–Kannur	320 km/h (200 mph)	430 km (270 mi)	Standard	Awaiting Approval	TBD	
Delhi–Amritsar	320 km/h (200 mph)	480 km (300 mi)	Standard	DPR under preparation	2031	
Nagpur–Varanasi	320 km/h (200 mph)	855 km (531 mi)	Standard	Proposed	2032	
Amritsar–Jammu	320 km/h (200 mph)	190 km (120 mi)	Standard	Proposed	2032	
Ahmedabad–Rajkot	220 km/h (140 mph)	225 km (140 mi)	Standard	Proposed	TBD	

=== Iran ===
Iran has high-speed rail under construction to connect the three major cities of Tehran, Qom and Isfahan, with a station at Imam Khomeini International Airport. The route will be 422 km (262 mi) with an operating speed of 350 kilometres per hour (220 mph), reducing travel time from five hours to 90 minutes. The project, costing over €7 billion, is being built by China Railway Engineering Corporation.

A 117-km (73-mi), 300-kilometre-per-hour (190 mph) double-track branch from Qom to Arak will be built at a cost of €1.2 billion (including the Arak station and six viaducts) with a contract the Islamic Republic of Iran Railways initially awarded to Italian-based Ferrovie dello stato in 2017. The contract was re-awarded to Chinese corporations with the imposition of US-led sanctions the following year, with other rail projects.

High-speed rail was planned to link Tehran to Mashhad, Iran's second-largest city. The planned 2016 800 kilometres (500 mi), 400-kilometre-per-hour (250 mph) would have decreased travel time from eight to 3.5 hours. A reduced $1.5 billion plan for electrification and upgrading of the existing 967-kilometre (601 mi) line, with speeds increasing from 160 to 200 kilometres per hour (99 to 124 mph), was signed by a consortium of the Iranian MAPNA Group and Chinese companies in July 2017; China backed out in January 2021.

=== Israel ===
In 2020, Israel's National Infrastructure Committee approved high-speed rail links between the country's four metropolitan cities: Jerusalem, Tel Aviv, Haifa and Beersheba. The project is slated for completion by 2040, with a top speed of 250 km/h. The high-speed electrified connection between Tel Aviv and Haifa, which will cost $3.8 billion and reduce travel time from one hour to 30 minutes, is due to be completed by 2030 but has no budget for rolling stock. Further plans for completion by 2040 include an extension north of Haifa, a continuation from Tel Aviv through Ben Gurion Airport to Jerusalem, and a connection to Beersheva.

=== Japan ===
L0 series maglev train on the Yamanashi test track

Proposed Shinkansen lines as defined in the Nationwide Shinkansen Development Act

A maglev line between Tokyo and Osaka, the Chūō Shinkansen, is under construction by the Central Japan Railway Company (JR Central). The Nagoya-Tokyo section is planned to open in 2027, and the Nagoya-Osaka section is projected for completion in 2037.

The route is to be privately financed through bond sales by JR Central, and the intermediate stations will be financed by local governments. JR Central expects that it will need at least eight years between the completion of the Tokyo section and the beginning of construction of the Osaka section to rebuild its financial position. The federal government is exploring options to accelerate the project.

Research on high-speed rail systems based on magnetic levitation, led by JR Central, has been ongoing since the 1970s. The trains and guideways are technologically ready, and over 100,000 passengers have ridden them. Pre-Series L0 crewed trains on the Yamanashi test line have reached speeds of 603 kilometres per hour (375 mph), making them the fastest trains in the world. The Yamanashi test track is to be incorporated into the under-construction Tokyo–Osaka maglev route.

Extensions to the current network expansions, notably from Hakodate to Sapporo, have been approved for construction. The route of the final extension of the Hokuriku Shinkansen has not been finalised. It will ultimately provide a northern route to Osaka.

Conventional routes planned in 1973 are on hold, to be built after the current lines open. A Hokkaido Shinkansen extension was proposed during the 1970s to the Russian border via tunnel. A tunnel to South Korea has also been proposed.

Line	Speed	Length	Construction start	Expected start of revenue service
Hokkaido Shinkansen extension (Sapporo–Asahikawa)	320+ km/h	130 km	on hold	2045
Sapporo–Oshamambe	200+ km/h	180 km	on hold	2045
Uetsu Shinkansen (Toyama–Aomori via Niigata)	200+ km/h	560 km	on hold	2030+
Ōu Shinkansen (Fukushima–Akita via Yamagata)	200+ km/h	270 km	on hold	2030+
Hokuriku Shinkansen (Tokyo–Osaka via Kanazawa)	200+ km/h	50 km	Tokyo to Tsuruga via Kanazawa in operation, Tsuruga to Osaka planned	2045
Trans-Chūgoku Shinkansen (Okayama–Matsue)	260 km/h	150 km	on hold	2030+
San'in Shinkansen (Osaka–Shimonoseki via Tottori & Matsue)	260 km/h	550 km	on hold	2030+
Shikoku Shinkansen (Osaka–Oita via Matsuyama)	260 km/h	440 km	on hold	2045
Trans-Shikoku Shinkansen (Okayama–Kōchi)	260 km/h	150 km	on hold	2045
East Kyūshū Shinkansen (Hakata–Kagoshima-Chūō via Ōita)	260 km/h	390 km	on hold	2045
Trans-Kyūshū Shinkansen (Ōita–Kumamoto)	260 km/h	120 km	on hold	2045

=== Kazakhstan ===
Qazaqstan Temir Zholy, Kazakhstan's national rail company, has awarded a contract to oversee the design and construction of a high-speed line from Astana (the country's capital) to Almaty (its largest city). The line, expected to be 1,011 km (628 mi) long, will run via Karaganda and Balkhash. A 10-kilometre (6.2 mi) viaduct across Lake Balkhash is planned near Sayaq. The trains are expected by be built by Tulpar-Talgo (a joint venture established in 2011 between Qazaqstan Temir Zholy and the Spanish company Talgo), will have a maximum speed of 250 km/h (155 mph) and make the trip in five-and-a-half hours. The system will use Russian gauge, like Kazakhstan's existing conventional lines. In 2021, Kazakh Prime Minister Asqar Mamin announced plans for high-speed rail line to Tashkent, Uzbekistan, via Shymkent and Turkistan in Kazakhstan.

=== North Korea ===
Attempts were made during the 1970s to speed up North Korea's network, when one electric trainset (using bullet-train design) was built. The trainset never entered regular service due to the economic crisis which followed the dissolution of the Soviet Union. The Chinese government proposed a high-speed railway for the country during the 2000s, but the proposal is still far from the planning stage. Changes in foreign policy in during 2017 and 2018 encouraged both Koreas to begin international railway projects, and the chair of the State Affairs Commission has shown an interest in high-speed rail technology.

=== Malaysia & Singapore ===
A high-speed rail running at 300 km/h (186 mph) to link Kuala Lumpur and Singapore was proposed in 2006 by YTL Corporation, operator of the KLIA Express in Malaysia; the company also proposed a similar system during the late 1990s. Plans for the project were put on hold in April 2008 due to the high cost to the government, estimated at RM8 billion. The project has been opposed by rail-operator rivals such as Keretapi Tanah Melayu, and the liberalisation of the Kuala Lumpur-Singapore air route also dampened its prospects for the proposal.

In 2007, Siemens expressed interest in providing technology for the proposed rail link. By the middle of 2009, YTL revived talk about the project and expressed hope that the Malaysian government would reexamine the proposal since delays in the project have increased development costs.

In 2010, Malaysia made a proposal to revive the project. In the new proposal, the route will be in two phases: the first from Kuala Lumpur to Singapore, and the second from Kuala Lumpur to Penang.

On 19 February 2013, Singapore and Malaysia announced an agreement to build a high-speed rail link between Kuala Lumpur and Singapore by 2020. The KL–Singapore section, planned to be about 380 km long, would have an estimated travel time of 90 minutes. The high-speed railway terminus for Singapore would be in Jurong East, at the Jurong Country Club site, and the terminus for Malaysia would be at the former RMAF Kuala Lumpur Air Base.

After the landslide defeat of Prime Minister Najib Razak in May 2018, his successor Mahathir Mohamad told the Financial Times that the project would be delayed in favor of cheaper alternatives such as spending RM 20 billion to upgrade the Keretapi Tanah Melayu (KTM) line to 200 km/h and extending it to Jurong East. On 5 September 2018, an agreement to postpone the project until 31 May 2020 was signed between Singapore and Malaysia. Completion was pushed back to 1 January 2031 from 31 December 2026 after initial plans to scrap it. Malaysia also paid Singapore S$15 million on 31 January 2019 as compensation for suspending the project.

On 31 May 2020, Singapore agreed to Malaysia's request to delay the project to discuss and clarify proposed changes by 31 December of that year. Since no agreement was reached by that date, the HSR project was terminated on 1 January 2021. As a result, Malaysia paid about S$102.8 million to Singapore on 29 March 2021. In March 2022, talks were scheduled again between the Malaysian and Singaporean governments to revive the high-speed rail project with new terms.

On 26 February 2022, Thailand and Malaysia agreed to conduct a feasibility study of a line between Kuala Lumpur and Bangkok. On 17 May of that year, the countries established a joint committee to coordinate the planning of a Bangkok-Kuala Lumpur HSR project. The project was still under discussion by May 2023, with no concrete plans.

=== Myanmar ===
Plans have been announced to build a high-speed railway between Yangon and Kunming in China, a distance of 1920 km. Construction was planned to begin after agreements with China were signed in 2011.^{[11]} The project, put on hold in 2014 due to financial feasibility and national-security concerns, was revived in 2019.

=== Oman ===
Oman has planned a 2,144-km high-speed rail network connecting the seaports of Salalah, Duqm, and Sohar, and linking with the Gulf Railway at Hafeet on its border with the United Arab Emirates. The project was put on hold in 2014 due to falling oil prices, and the link to the Gulf Railway was suspended in 2016. The planned network would be double-tracked, non-electrified, with a speed of 220 km/h passenger traffic with a planned increase to 350 km/h, and international connections with Yemen through Mazyounah and to the United Arab Emirates through Al-Buraimi.

=== Pakistan ===
Pakistan's railway minister said in 2016 that when the ministry asked about high-speed rail in Pakistan as part of the CPEC Project, the Chinese recommended a 160-km/h semi-high-speed service instead. The minister added that there was no market for such a project, and the country could not afford it at the time. However, Pakistan has announced that there will be a new Lahore-Rawalpindi high speed line, as well as an upgrade to the Lahore-Karachi route - decreasing travel time from 16 hours to around 5 hours - reaching 160 km/h on that route, as well as 250 km/h for the Lahore-Rawalpindi HSR. Testings for the HSR are expected to happen around 2029, with the line to be operational by the 2030s. The ML-1 upgrade will be most likely completed by the 2030s as well.

=== Persian Gulf countries ===
The countries of the Gulf Cooperation Council (UAE, Oman, Qatar, Bahrain, Kuwait and Saudi Arabia) plan a 2,200-kilometre rail network, Etihad Rail, which may include high-speed rail from Dubai to Abu Dhabi. A freight line currently exists.

In 2010, the government of Qatar announced that it planned to have high-speed rail links to Bahrain and Saudi Arabia built in time for the 2022 FIFA World Cup. The project was sidetracked by the Qatar crisis, but in early 2022 the Qatari and Saudi ministers of transport resumed talks about the proposed high-speed rail link.

In 2022, the Saudi Crown Prince proposed The Line: a 500-km/h rail line in Tabuk Province. Saudi transportation authorities were studying a high-speed link in September 2022 between Riyadh and the Eastern Province, with a planned travel time of one hour and 15 minutes. In May 2023, the Kuwaiti government proposed a $3.25 million feasibility study for a 111-km line from Nuwaiseeb Point to Al-Shaddadiyah (Kuwait City) which would link its network to Saudi Arabia's.

=== Philippines ===
The San Miguel Corporation proposed building a bullet-train system connecting Laoag in northern Luzon island with Manila and the Bicol Region in southeastern Luzon. By 2010, the project had been put on hold.

In April 2013, the National Economic and Development Authority (NEDA) announced plans by Metro Pacific Investments to fund a Clark-Metro Manila high-speed train project as part of a build–operate–transfer scheme. The project, Express Airport Trains, will have at least three stops in Metro Manila and will be built between lanes of the North Luzon Expressway (NLEx). The trains are planned to stop in Quezon City, Manila, and Makati. It would be higher-speed rail, similar to the Tel Aviv–Jerusalem railway (which was also marketed during its planning stage as a high-speed line). The PNR South Main Line reconstruction project, South Long Haul, will have express trains with the same maximum speed.

Projects such as PNR South Long Haul are being designed for an eventual upgrade to high-speed rail. There are also plans for a high-speed rail network in Mindanao as part of future upgrades to the proposed Mindanao Railway network, with a top speed of 250 km/h (160 mph).

=== Thailand ===
Planned Thai high speed rail system in 2022

The State Railway of Thailand and the Thai Ministry of Transport have plans for several high-speed rail lines. An HSR line to the eastern seaboard was first proposed in 1996, but there was no progress for over a decade. In 2009, the government asked the Office of Transport and Traffic Policy and Planning (OTP) to create a plan for a new HSR network which included an eastern line to Rayong. In October 2009, it was reported that funding was being sought for four lines linking Bangkok to Chiang Mai (711 km), Nong Khai (600 km), Chanthaburi (330 km), and Padang Besar (983 km). The Thai cabinet reportedly approved the plan the following month, with the shorter eastern route to Chanthaburi intended for construction first. The total cost of all routes is ฿800 billion (US$25 billion). In October 2010, the Thai parliament approved initial proposals for a high-speed rail network to be built with Chinese industrial partners; five lines capable of 250 km/h would radiate from Bangkok, with the line to Ubon Ratchathani later dropped. The routes were finalized before the 2011 election, with a promise to begin construction the following year if the government was re-elected; they lost the election.

After the 2011 election of opposition leader Yingluck Shinawatra, the new government reviewed all HSR plans. It divided them into phases, prioritizing service between Bangkok and Pattaya, Hua Hin, and Nakhon Ratchasima, and expected to tender the lines in 2014.

There were further delays while the military government reviewed all HSR lines after the May 2014 coup, and it initially deferred all projects. Transport Minister Prajin Juntong and his Japanese counterpart, Akihiro Ota, signed an agreement on 27 May 2015 to conduct a feasibility study of the northern HSR. The NCPO agreed in early 2016 to proceed with the eastern HSR route and suggested that it could be extended to Don Mueang International Airport beyond the terminus at Bang Sue Grand Station, providing direct links between Bangkok's three major airports (including Suvarnabhumi Airport and U-Tapao International Airport). In 2017, the Office of Traffic Policy and Planning, the Ministry of Transport and the State Railway of Thailand agreed to the revised plan. In October of that year, the Eastern Economic Corridor Office finalized plans to build a 10-station Eastern HSR line linking Don Mueang Airport, Bang Sue, Makkasan, Suvarnabhumi Airport, Chonburi, Si Racha, Pattaya, U-Tapao Airport, and Rayong. The section to Rayong was excluded in early 2018 due to environmental and safety concerns, and it was decided that the line would end at U-Tapao Airport. In October 2019, after months of delay, the Thai government signed a $7.4 billion agreement with a Charoen Pokphand-China Railway Construction consortium to build eastern HSR from Bangkok to Pattaya in a public-private partnership, with assets reverting to the state after 50 years.

The Japan International Cooperation Agency conducted a feasibility study of northern HSR to Chiang Mai, and reported in 2018 that passenger projections were too low for economic viability. The 670-kilometer line was estimated to cost ฿400 billion, and private investors and the Japanese government declined the project. The Ministry of Transport denied that Japan cancelled the project. On 14 December 2022, the Department of Railways and MLIT-JICA discussed speeding up feasibility studies for the Bangkok-Chiang Mai HSR to March 2023, and requested a study on the economic impact of the station-area development.

The Southern HSR to Hua Hin would be 211 km, with an estimated cost of ฿152 billion, and an extension to the Malaysian border was discussed in September 2021. Malaysia and Thailand agreed in 2022 to set up a joint committee to coordinate a Bangkok-Kuala Lumpur high-speed rail project, beginning a feasibility study in February.

In summer 2022, Thailand was committed to build a $12 billion northeastern HSR line to the Laotian border by 2028 at 250 km/h double-tracked standard gauge. In March 2023, Japan and Thailand continued to discuss beginning construction between Bangkok and Chiang Mai. Thailand agreed to a technology-transfer deal with China in May, with Chinese rail standards. Local opposition in Nakhon Ratchasima led to a change in design adding $131 million in costs and 28 months to the construction schedule to add an 8 km viaduct; problems are ongoing for the Ayutthaya station.

=== Turkey ===
A planned link from Ankara to Aksaray, Ulukışla, and Mersin have an anticipated opening in 2024, but has not yet been tendered. The Turkish government intends to connect 52 provinces with high-speed rail networks by 2053, and will develop further lines as current construction is completed.

A 247-km extension from Sivas to Kars is concretely planned as an electrified, double-track line with a design speed of 250 km/h, and a five-station design study between Sivas and Erzincan was completed in July 2021.

A spur from Yerköy to Kayseri has not yet been tendered but is planned to be completed by 2025, reducing travel time between Ankara and Kayseri from seven hours to two hours. The 142-km spur to Kayseri would be double-track electrified rail designed for 250-km/h operation, with nine tunnels totaling 12.9 km. Construction on the spur began in July 2022, and will include stations at Şefaatli, Yenifakılı, and Himmetdede.

The Ankara-Izmir high-speed railway is a planned 588-km double-track, electrified railway built for 250-km/h operation whose initial section to Afyonkarahisar was scheduled to open in 2022, but construction was interrupted in 2018 and resumed in 2022. The extension to Izmir will contain 49 tunnels totaling 41 km, 56 viaducts totaling 23 km and six new stations, reducing the current nine-hour trip to three-and-a-half hours.

A 106-km spur off the Istanbul-Ankara line from Osmaneli to Bursa is planned to open by 2023, after construction delays due to earthquake risk and expropriation lawsuits; a further extension to Bandirma was tendered in 2020. The full 201-km line will be built for 200-km/h operation and will cost ₺9.5 billion (US$650 million), reducing travel time between Ankara and Bursa to two hours and ten minutes.

A 229-km high-speed rail line on the European side of the Bosporus will link the Halkalı railway station in Istanbul with the Kapıkule railway station in Edirne, with an anticipated opening of 2023, and will decrease travel time from four hours to one hour and 20 minutes. The double-track, electrified railway will be built for 200-km/h operation and cost ₺10.5 billion ($716 million), of which over half is a European Union grant.

In early 2024, the country's Minister of Transport Abdulkadir Uraloğlu announced plans to build an additional line from Delice to Sungurlu, Çorum OSB, Çorum, Mecitözü, Merzifon, Havza, Kavak, and ending in Samsun on the coast of the Black Sea. This will cut travel time of the 509 km segment between Ankara and Samsun from 7 hours to 2:45 hours.

Ankara - Istanbul SHD, is a double-track, electric, signaled high-speed railway project suitable for a maximum speed of 350 kilometers/hour (220 mph), which is planned to provide services in 2030s.

=== Turkmenistan ===
President Gurbanguli Berdimuhamedov announced that Turkmenistan would build a high-speed train between Turkmenbashi and Turkmenabat in 2012.

=== Uzbekistan ===
In addition to the high-speed network from Tashkent through Samarkand to Bukhara, in December 2021 the Asian Development Bank approved a $162 million loan for electrification between Bukhara and Khiva which was 60 percent of the anticipated cost. The 452-km line has a design speed of 250 km/h, and needs electrification for high-speed rail service. A contract was awarded in July 2022 to DB E&C for electrification; construction was scheduled to begin in fall 2022, with stops at Navbokhar, Parvoz, Kiyikli, Zhaikhun, Turon, Khazarasp, and Urgench. High-speed rail service to Khiva is planned to begin in 2024, reducing travel time between Bukhara and Khiva from eight to three hours; in November 2022, President Shavkat Mirziyoyev announced an electrification extension from Khiva to Nukus.

=== Vietnam ===
Vietnam's national railway company, Vietnam Railways, has proposed a 1,630-kilometre (1,013 mi) high-speed rail link between Hanoi and Ho Chi Minh City capable of running at 250 to 300 km/h (155 to 186 mph). Funding of the $56 billion line would be primarily by the Vietnamese government, with Japanese aid. Technology used on the Japanese Shinkansen has been suggested for the new railway.

Current technology allows trains travelling on the current, single-track Hanoi to Ho Chi Minh City line to complete the journey in about thirty hours. The high-speed rail line would have two standard gauge tracks with no direct road crossings, and would allow trains to complete the Hanoi–Ho Chi Minh City journey in about six hours. The existing line uses narrow-gauge tracks, common in Southeast Asia.

Vietnamese Prime Minister Nguyễn Tấn Dũng had planned to complete the line by 2013, three years sooner than the previously announced nine-year construction time. Later reports suggested that Japanese development aid would only be available in stages, with completion of the line not expected until the mid-2030s and aid contingent on the use of Shinkansen technology. On 19 June 2010, after a month of deliberation, Vietnam's National Assembly rejected the high-speed rail proposal due to its cost. The project's future was in doubt, with National Assembly deputies reportedly asking for further study.

In January 2011, Vietnamese Minister of Transport Hồ Nghĩa Dũng suggested that the line might be completed by 2030. The line was 1,555 km long, with trains running at 300 km/h. After the original plan was rejected by the National Assembly, Dũng asked for a new feasibility plan by the end of 2011; the Japanese development agency suggested an interim solution in which the line could be built in separate north and south sections. In 2021, the Vietnamese Ministry of Transport announced plans to begin a 250-km segment from Hanoi to Vinh and a 450-km segment between Ho Chi Minh City and Nha Trang in 2028, with a total cost of $5 billion and a design speed of 320 km/h. In July 2022, Prime Minister Phạm Minh Chính requested $10 billion in aid from the Japan Bank for International Cooperation for the project. The Communist Party reaffirmed the strategic importance in March 2023 that the north-south high-speed rail project begin construction by 2030 and finish by 2045, focusing on the Hanoi-Vinh and Ho Chi Minh-Nha Trang sections; the project is estimated to cover 1,559 km, with a speed over 320 km/h and a cost of over $58 billion.

In April 2024, Vietnam announced plans to create high-speed lines from Haiphong and Quang Ninh province through Hanoi to Lao Cai in order to cross into the Yunnan province of China, as well as another line from Hanoi through Lang Son to cross into the Guangxi province of China.

== Europe ==
=== Austria ===
In March 2024, the Austrian Federal Ministry of Climate Protection, Environment, Energy, Mobility, Innovation and Technology unveiled the Target Network 2040 (Zielnetz 2040) which included plans for a new high-speed railway line between Wels and the German border enabling travel times of 2.5 hours between Vienna and Munich.

=== Belarus ===
In 2017, Belarusian authorities agreed to offer land to CRCC Asia for construction of a high-speed corridor between the European Union (EU) and Russia. Chinese engineering companies are also interested in building highways and Russian high-speed railways in connection with this route, with a possible interchange with the Moscow–Kazan high-speed rail corridor.

=== Belgium ===
The 25N line (opened between 2012 and 2018) is designed for speeds up to 220 km/h, but is limited to 160 km/h. To reduce traffic and travel time, an existing line from Mechelen to Antwerp has been upgraded. Construction began in June 2013 and was completed in November 2021, and it was opened on 14 December of that year.

=== Czech Republic ===
In 2017, the government of the Czech Republic approved a high-speed rail development program predicted to cost 645 billion Kč (over €25 billion). The network will cover about 660 kilometers, and will include the construction of new lines and upgrading existing lines to 200 km/h.

- RS1 – Prague–Brno–Ostrava, with a possible extension to Katowice in Poland
- RS2 – Brno–Breclav, with possible extensions to Vienna in Austria and Bratislava in Slovakia
- RS3 – Prague–Plzen, with a possible extension to Munich in Germany
- RS4 – Prague–Ústí nad Labem, with a possible extension to Dresden in Germany
- RS5 – Prague–Liberec or Hradec Králové, with a possible extension to Wrocław in Poland

In 2018, Správa železnic (the Czech railway infrastructure manager) began work on three pilot projects to increase speed on existing lines. These include the sections between Prague and Poříčany (30 km), Brno and Vranovice (25 km), and Přerov and Ostrava (60 km).

In 2020, Deutsche Bahn and the Czech government began feasibility studies of a high-speed rail link (RS4) between Prague and Dresden. The project, projected to cost €5.4 billion, and will include a 25-km tunnel beneath the Ore Mountains. Travel time on the current route is two hours and 15 minutes, with the new link predicted to reduce travel time between Prague and Dresden to 60 minutes. The first section (between Prague and Lovosice) is predicted to be completed by 2035, with the remainder completed by 2050.

=== Denmark ===
A high-speed rail line was built as a double track on the Copenhagen–Ringsted Line, which opened in 2019. It initially allowed 180 km/h (112 mph), increasing to 200 km/h (125 mph) in 2023 when signalling was upgraded. The rail infrastructure is being prepared for 250 km/h (155 mph). An upgrade of the Ringsted–Odense line to 200 km/h is planned. The Ringsted–Rødbyhavn line is being upgraded to 200 km/h in preparation for the completion of the Fehmarn tunnel, allowing a fast connection between Copenhagen and Hamburg.

Construction began on the Vestfyn Line, a 250 km/h line connecting Odense on the island of Funen to the bridge to Jutland in 2021, allowing alignment to a future bridge for high-speed crossing. A 250 km/h railway from Fredericia–Aarhus is planned. The Hobro-Aalborg line is planned to be upgraded to 200 km/h with new signalling. The projects are planned to reduce travel time between Copenhagen and Aalborg to 3 hours, compared to 4 hours and 20 minutes in 2018.

=== Estonia ===
An undersea Helsinki–Tallinn Tunnel is a proposed high-speed rail connection between Helsinki and Tallinn with planned maximum speed of 250 km/h (155 mph). This high speed connection would cut the travel time from about 3 hours to half an hour.

=== Finland ===
The Helsinki–Turku high-speed railway is a proposed link between Helsinki and Turku with planned maximum speed of 300 km/h (186 mph). A high-speed connection between Helsinki and Tampere with a travel time of one hour through the planned Lentorata tunnel from Helsinki to Kerava via Helsinki Airport station is planned, with an upgrade of the Riihimäki–Tampere railway to high speed or construction of a parallel line. Itärata, an eastern high-speed line between Helsinki and Kouvola via the airport and Porvoo, is also planned.

=== Hungary ===
On 28 January 2020, a call for tenders was issued for a detailed feasibility study of the proposed line between Budapest and Cluj-Napoca in Romania. The Hungarian section is expected to allow speeds of 250 to 350 km/h (155 to 217 mph), and the Romanian section will have a speed of 160 km/h (100 mph).

=== Iceland ===
The Lava Express, an airport rail link passing southeastern Iceland's lava fields, is planned. The line will be 49 km long, of which 14 km will be underground near Reykjavík. Average speed will be 180 km/h (112 mph), with a maximum speed of 250 km/h (155 mph). Construction was postponed by 2021 due to the COVID-19 pandemic.

=== Ireland ===
The Irish government said in 2020 that it would begin a study of a 500 km high-speed railway from Belfast via Dublin to Cork and Limerick, which could cost about €15 billion.

The All-Island Strategic Rail Review, published in 2024, ruled out building railways capable of 300 km/h (186 mph), but instead recommended upgrading the lines linking Dublin with Belfast, Athenry, Cork and Waterford to 200 km/h (125 mph) operation; including by building new dedicated high-speed corridors linking Clongriffin–Drogheda, Belfast–Newry, Derry-Portadown and Portarlington–Hazelhatch.

=== Netherlands ===
The proposed HSL-Oost line was cancelled in 2009. The section of that line between Amsterdam and Utrecht is four-tracked. Two of the four tracks can accommodate 200 km/h (125 mph), but the voltage is insufficient and the line is planned to be re-electrified to 25 kV AC. Like much of the Netherlands, also, the ground is not stable enough for higher speeds due to peat deposits.

=== Norway ===
The Norwegian government has studied five long-distance high-speed lines radiating from Oslo to Bergen, Kristiansand/Stavanger, Trondheim, Gothenburg, and Stockholm. A sixth line would run along the coast, connecting Bergen, Haugesund and Stavanger. Cost and benefit studies were published in 2007 and 2012.

=== Poland ===
The Central Rail Line was designed for speeds up to 250 km/h. Although 200 km/h is used for commercial service, higher speeds are planned.

=== Portugal ===
Portuguese prime minister António Costa announced in September 2022 a $4.7 billion passenger rail line running about 300 km (185 miles) from Lisbon-Oriente to Porto-Campanhã, cutting travel time by over 50 percent to 75 minutes non-stop and 105 minutes with stops in Leiria, Coimbra and Aveiro. A second phase would include another 150-km (100 miles) line to Porto Airport, Braga, Valença, and a connection to Vigo in Spain. A Porto–Lisbon high-speed rail line was proposed in 2020. The Spanish company Renfe has confirmed that the desire to extend the Madrid-Extremadura high-speed rail line under construction across the border to Evora.

An update in early 2024 revealed that the project has been recast in three stages, with the first section between Porto and Oiã near Aveiro for 1.9 billion euros, and the second section between Aveiro and Soure to cost 1.7 billion euros. The second phase extends the line southwards from Soure to Carregado at a cost of 1.5 billion euros, scheduled for 2030. The third phase would connect Carregado to Lisbon, bringing the total journey time to 1 h 15 minutes at 300 km/h over 290 kilometers.

=== Romania ===
The European Commission approved €3.9 billion for rail in Romania's National Recovery and Resilience Plan in 2021, which will modernize railways, rolling stock, and signaling systems. A €120 million feasibility study of a high-speed line between Constanta through Bucharest to the Hungarian border was begun in 2022, and is expected to be completed by 2026. Options include a high-speed 590-km route through Sibiu, Cluj, and Oradea, which could cost €17 billion euros; another possibility is a hybrid line with some sections at 200 km/h, and others at 160 km/h.

=== Russia ===
Since the 1980s, several high-speed rail networks have been proposed. Vladimir Putin announced plans at a 2013 St. Petersburg economic forum to build a 770-km high-speed line which would connect Kazan and Moscow. Russia's first high-speed line, trains would operate at up to 350 km/h and travel time would be reduced from 13 hours to 3.5. Trains on the Moscow–St. Petersburg line run at up to 250 km/h.

In September 2023, President Putin announced a 1.7 trillion ruble (US$18 billion) new project to build two new tracks between Moscow and St. Petersburg, increasing train speeds to 400 km/h over the 650 km journey, with financing by VEB.RF and Gazprombank for a proposed operation date of 2028. The long-stalled plans for a line between Moscow and Kazan have been resumed, with Chinese CRRC contracted to build part of the track and supply the trainsets at a Russian-owned Ural Locomotives plant, with the full project expected to be completed by 2024. The final proposed line is between Moscow and Rostov-on-Don, by the Ukrainian border. In early 2024, the master plan for the Moscow-St. Petersburg high speed railway was approved.

=== Spain ===
As of March 2024, the following lines are under construction:

- Basque Country HSR: between Bilbao, Donostia-San Sebastián and Vitoria-Gasteiz. This line is part of the European Atlantic Corridor.
- Extremadura HSR: (Phase 1 opened in 2022 between Plasencia, Cáceres and Badajoz), Phase 2 under construction between Toledo and Plasencia.
- Cantabria HSR: between Palencia and Santander, although the line will only reach Reinosa.
- European Mediterranean Corridor, under construction along the line with different opening dates, the French Border - Almería section is expected in 2026 and the whole line to Algeciras in 2030.
- Zaragoza - Navarra - Vitoria-Gasteiz HSR: is the connection between the Basque Country HSR and the Madrid - Barcelona HSR.
- HSR Connection to Madrid Barajas international Airport, it will connect the Airport with Madrid Chamartín, which is now being expanded and updated.

In the summer of 2023, the Spanish government pledged €2.3 million for a design study of a high-speed rail tunnel across the Strait of Gibraltar to connect to Moroccan high-speed rail in Tangier.

=== Sweden ===
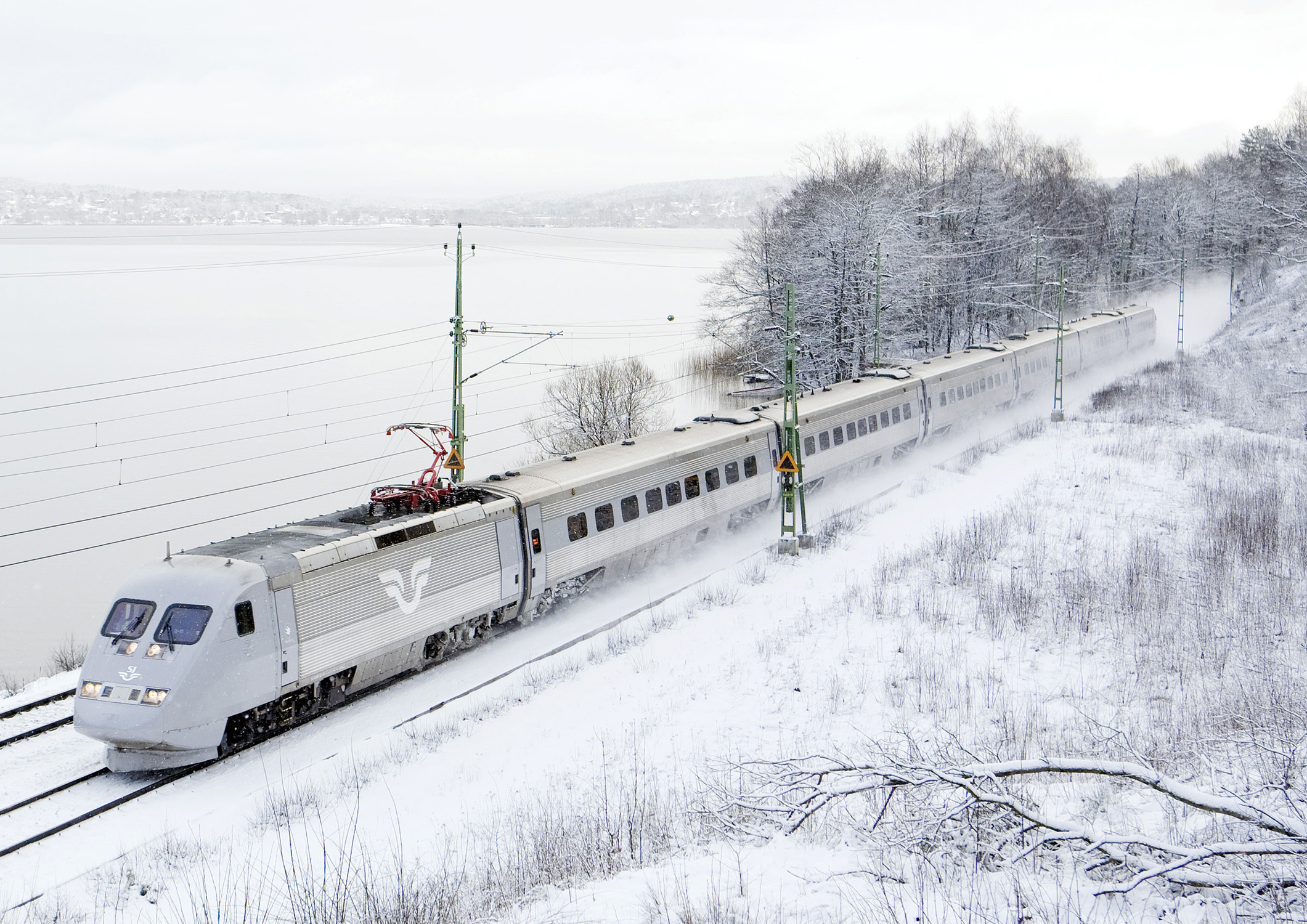
Swedish X 2000 launched in 1990 and it has a top speed of 210 km/h

Many new railway lines in Sweden, including Botniabanan, Grödingebanan, Mälarbanan, Svealandsbanan, Västkustbanan, Vänernbanan (Gothenburg–Trollhättan), can accommodate speeds up to 250 km/h. The country's signaling system (ATC), however, does not allow speeds over 200 km/h. It is being replaced by the European Rail Traffic Management System (ERTMS), allowing speeds up to 250 km/h. ERTMS level 2 has been installed and is being tested on Botniabanan, which allows 250 km/h although passenger trains operate at 200. The Bombardier Regina X55 has been delivered to the SJ rail corporation with a maximum speed of 200 km/h and an option to upgrade the EMU to 250 km/h.

Four major high-speed projects have been proposed in Sweden with speeds between 250 and 350 km/h:

- Norrbotniabanan (Umeå–Luleå) will be built for 250 km/h with mixed passenger and freight traffic in northern Sweden to relieve the congested, outdated single-track Main Line Through Upper Norrland, increase freight traffic, and speed up passenger traffic along the coast.
  - Umeå–Dåva (15 km): Under construction since 2018, it is expected to be ready in 2024 initially for firewood freight to the main heating plant in Umeå.
  - Dåva–Skellefteå: Construction is planned to begin by 2030.
- Ostlänken (Järna–Linköping) would relieve the congested, slow main lines on the Järna-Linköping section of the Southern Main Line. Construction is planned to begin around 2025.
- Götalandsbanan (Gothenburg–Jönköping–Linköping to Stockholm via Ostlänken) would reduce travel time from Gothenburg to Stockholm from three hours and five minutes to two hours. The part Gothenburg–Borås is as of 2025 seriously planned with construction start around 2030 and operation around 2040. Borås–Jönköping–Linköping is much less prioritized.
- Europabanan (Jönköping–Lund), with a speed of 320 km/h The part Hässleholm–Lund is as of 2025 seriously planned with construction start around 2030 and operation around 2040. Jönköping-Hässleholm is much less prioritized.

The first three have been studied in detail by the Swedish Transport Administration, and some alignments have been decided. There is political interest in building all four. The Moderate Party government decided in 2012 to build Ostlänken with a maximum speed of 250 km/h after putting all projects on hold in the 2011 budget.

==== Planned lines ====
Line	Speed	Length	Construction began	Expected start of revenue services
The North Bothnia Line; Norrbotniabanan	250 km/h (155 mph)	270 km	2018 (Umeå–Dåva); 2026 (Dåva–Skellefteå); 2033 Planned (Skellefteå–Luleå)	2026; 2032 or 2036–2038 (Dåva–Skellefteå); TBD (Skellefteå–Luleå)
The East Link; Ostlänken	250 km/h (155 mph)	160 km	November 2024	2035
Gothenburg–Borås Double Tracks	250 km/h (155 mph)	60 km	2029–2031	2039–2041
Hässleholm–Lund Quad Tracks	250 km/h (155 mph)	60 km	No earlier than 2034; Maybe 2031–2032 (Klostergården–Stångby)	≈2040

=== Ukraine ===
During the early 2000s, Ukraine planned to build 2,593 km of high-speed rail tracks between 2005 and 2015. Rolling stock was purchased in 2010. The maximum operating speed in Ukraine is still 160 km/h, however, and lack of maintenance has caused a number of derailments.

A Moscow-Kyiv high-speed line was proposed in 2011, but Ukraine canceled the project after the 2014 annexation of Crimea by the Russian Federation. Russia, which had purchased rolling stock for the planned rail line to Kyiv, used the trains on its Moscow-Nizhny Novgorod line. In January 2023, Ukraine Railways signed an agreement with the Polish government to develop a standard-gauge high-speed rail line from Warsaw through Lviv to Kyiv with a 250-km/h operating speed.

=== United Kingdom ===
High Speed 2 (HS2) is a planned high-speed rail line from London to Birmingham, which will connect to the existing British railway network. Its first phase, which will connect London and Birmingham, is expected to be completed between 2029 and 2033. The second phase, which was planned to connect Birmingham to Manchester, was cancelled in 2023. A proposed East Midlands Hub station to serve Nottingham and Derby as part of HS2 was also cancelled in 2021.

The first phase is currently under construction. Northern Powerhouse Rail is a proposed east–west line connecting Liverpool, Manchester and Leeds.

Greengauge 21 released its "Beyond HS2" report in May 2018, which examined how the rail network could develop by 2050. It proposed a number of projects:

- A new high-speed line from Colchester and Cambridge (via Stansted) to Stratford, possibly extending to Canary Wharf
- A new higher-speed line from Perth and Dundee to the Shotts Line
- A new high-speed line bypassing Motherwell
- A new connection between the HS2 eastern leg and Kingsbury, serving Bristol, Cardiff and Plymouth via Cheltenham Spa
- A new link between the West Coast Main Line and Crossrail
- A new link between Langley and Heathrow
- A new link between Richmond and Waterloo to Heathrow Terminal 2
- A new link between Heathrow and Staines
- Northern Powerhouse Rail
- A new line between Darlington and Newcastle

== Oceania ==
=== Australia ===
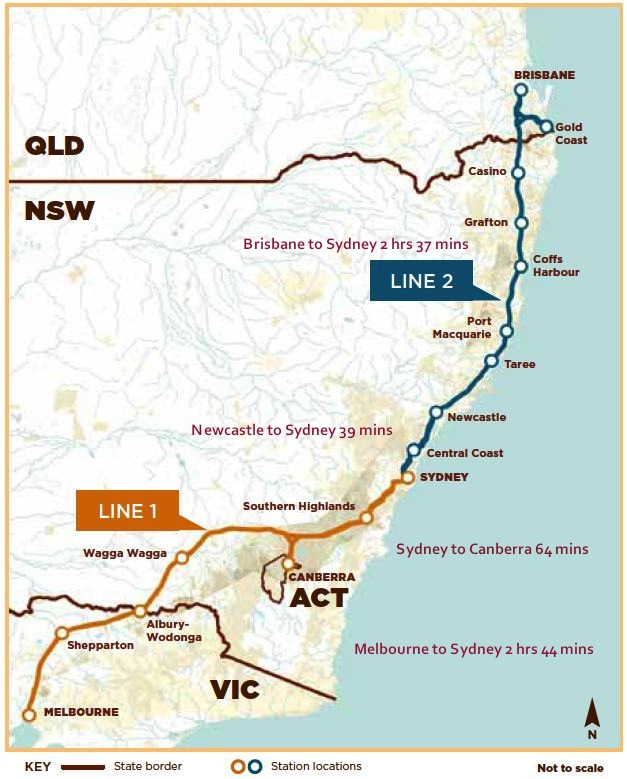
Proposed Australia east coast high-speed railway lines in 2013

Since the 1980s, there have been several proposals to develop an HSR line between Sydney and Canberra (via Sydney Airport and Canberra Airport) to link the cities and provide an effective second airport for Sydney. The line is proposed to continue to Melbourne, possibly via Melbourne Airport. The SYD-MEL air-traffic corridor is one of the world's busiest, and HSR would provide faster city-centre-to-city-centre travel times than flights. In September 2010, Infrastructure Partnership Australia (IPA) and AECOM proposed an east-coast very-fast-train corridor from the Sunshine Coast and Brisbane to Sydney, Canberra and Melbourne. The proposed 71-km Geelong Line (Melbourne-Geelong) would have a maximum speed of 300 km/h and enter service during the 2020s.

In May 2022, a leaked government document contained a draft for a 250 km/h Sydney-Wollongong-Newcastle rail network. Travel time between Parramatta and Newcastle would be reduced from 2.5 hours to one hour, and a Parramatta-Gosford trip would take 25 minutes; Parramatta to Canberra would take 90 minutes.

In November 2025, Infrastructure Australia approved plans to develop a high-speed railway to Newcastle via the Central Coast that were proposed by the high speed rail authority.

=== New Zealand ===
In 2020, as part of studies to increase the speed of Te Huia service from Auckland to Hamilton, a new standard gauge line was proposed at a cost of NZ$14.425 billion. Trains would travel at 250 km/h, and travel time between the cities would be 69 minutes.
