= High-speed rail in Sweden =

A map of railways in Sweden. High-speed lines are in red and orange.

In Sweden many trains run at 200 km/h (125 mph). Train types which currently attain this speed include the X 2000 tilting trains for long distances, the Regina (SJ 3000) widebody trains, the X40 double-decker regional trains, the Arlanda Airport Express X3, the VR X74-trains and the Stadler KISS (DOSTO) double-decker regional trains.

The X 2000 runs between many cities in Sweden including Stockholm, Gothenburg, and Malmö, and to Denmark's capital, Copenhagen, while the SJ 3000 runs services up to north of Sweden, Sundsvall and Umeå, as well as Norway's capital, Oslo. The Arlanda Express trains connect Stockholm and Stockholm-Arlanda Airport.

== Current plans ==
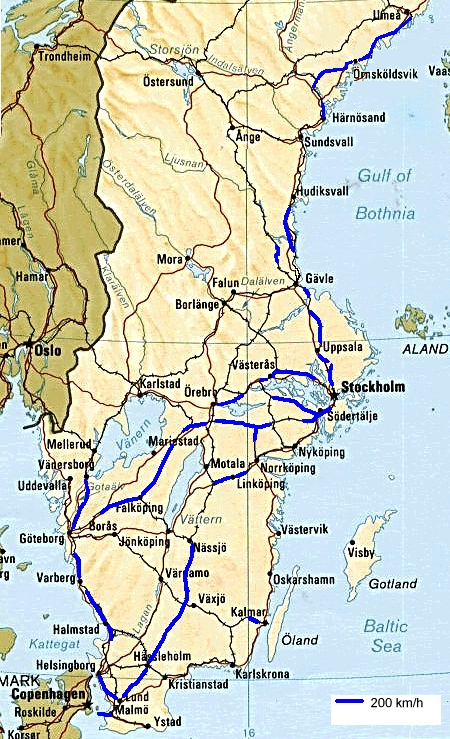
Railways with 200 km/h in operation 2012.

=== Upgrades to existing lines ===
Hundreds of kilometers of track are ready for 250 km/h (155 mph) operation, with the exception of signaling systems, catenary, and the trains themselves. A modified Regina test train, called "the Green Train", has attained a maximum speed of 303 km/h (188 mph), with regular service at 250 km/h (155 mph) planned.

There are plans for a 180 km (112 mi) section of the Stockholm-Malmö line to be upgraded to allow for speeds of 250 km/h (155 mph). The implementation of these plans has been postponed indefinitely as a decision is pending on the construction of a new parallel high-speed railway. Other railways that will eventually allow 250 km/h (155 mph) speeds (today 200 km/h (125 mph)) are long sections of Stockholm–Gothenburg, Gothenburg–Malmö, and Trollhättan–Gothenburg. A new Kramfors–Umeå line, Botniabanan has been ready for 250 km/h (155 mph) non-tilting trains since 2010, but train operators have not yet revealed plans for 250 km/h (155 mph) trains on Botniabanan, or on any other 250 km/h (155 mph) capable line. All these will be mixed passenger/freight railways.

The Swedish signalling system ATC does not currently allow for speeds higher than 200 km/h (125 mph), and current plans only allow for higher speeds with the EU-wide ERTMS signaling system. Botniabanan has had this system in operation since 2010, allowing 250 km/h (155 mph). The ATC system in theory allows 250 km/h (155 mph) but that would require reinstalling track equipment such as signal boxes, overhead catenary systems and signals as ATC uses point based transmission, and higher speed means new points of transmission. ATC is installed for 250 km/h (155 mph) along 16 km (9.9 mi) east of Södertälje but no trains are approved for that.

SJ have bought trains (type X55, delivered 2010) that are prepared for 250 km/h (155 mph) but limited to 200 km/h (125 mph) until a later date. In December 2021, Swedish national railway company SJ ordered 25 Zefiro Express trainsets with an option for 15 more from Bombardier Alstom, that will be capable of 250 km/h (155 mph). The trains are planned to be in service from 2027/2028.

=== New trainsets ===
In December 2021, SJ announced that they are ordering twenty-five SJ X250 trainsets (based on the Zefiro Express platform) which would be capable of going 250 km/h (155 mph). They are expected to go into service in 2027/2028 and will complement the X2000 service on the busiest lines (Stockholm—Gothenburg/Malmö) as well as cross-border traffic with Denmark and Norway. This should be seen as an investment to be able to utilise the faster speeds of the planned new mainlines from Stockholm to Gothenburg/Malmö via Jönköping, although the centre-right Swedish government under Prime Minister Ulf Kristersson has issued a new directive for the Swedish transportation agency Trafikverket to end/review those plans, and later decided to continue with parts of the plan such as the Ostlänken (The East Link) project, Gothenburg–Borås double tracks and Hässleholm–Lund quad tracks.

=== New lines ===
There were plans for completely new high-speed railways Stockholm–Linköping–Jönköping–Borås–Gothenburg ("Götalandsbanan") and Jönköping–Helsingborg–Copenhagen ("Europabanan" for the Swedish part), since the existing railways are relatively congested, with mixed 200 km/h (125 mph) passenger trains, slower regional trains and even slower cargo trains. The plans said that the new railways would be built similar to the French TGV-lines with long curve radii and relatively steep inclines allowing for speeds between 300–320 km/h (190–200 mph) with non-tilting trains, dedicated for high-speed passenger trains.

In 2018 Chinese corporations became interested in building of Stockholm-Oslo high-speed line. Trafikverket awarded American engineering firm Jacobs Engineering Group with the contract to consult on a proposed $24 billion high-speed rail network linking Stockholm with Gothenburg and Malmö.

In late 2022, the then newly elected centre-right Swedish government decided to completely abandon Sweden's high-speed rail project due to rising costs. Its new directive to the Swedish Transport Administration (Trafikverket) in late December stated that Trafikverket shall pause planning of all sections and analyse how costs could be lowered for the Borås – Gothenburg, Ostlänken (East Link project; Stockholm – Linköping) and Europaspåret (Jönköping – Hässleholm). It motivated this by the rising costs and wanting to increase regional passenger services, therefore not wanting to complete the whole high speed railway network project. However, Trafikverket has stated several times that it is impossible to further increase services on most lines where its needed due to full capacity on both the Southern Main Line and Western Main Line. Critics has pointed out that this makes it harder to increase railway cargo traffic, going against Swedens and the EU's promises to lower emissions. Also, a partial upgrade of the mainlines from double-track to four-track railway on busy sections, instead of building new double-track lines, would lead to major disturbances during the period of construction, as well as creating single points of failure where a large part of railway traffic would be halted if for instance an accident occurs on the line.

However, the government later chose to continue parts of the high-speed rail projects such as the Ostlänken (The East Link) project, Gothenburg–Borås double tracks and Hässleholm–Lund quad tracks.

== Major expansion projects ==
Line	Speed	Length	Construction began	Expected start of revenue services
The North Bothnia Line; Norrbotniabanan	250 km/h (155 mph)	270 km	2018 (Umeå–Dåva); 2026 (Dåva–Skellefteå); 2032–2033 Planned (Skellefteå–Luleå)	2026; 2032 or 2036–2038 (Dåva–Skellefteå); TBD (Skellefteå–Luleå)
The East Link; Ostlänken	250 km/h (155 mph)	160 km	November 2024	2035
Stockholm–Uppsala Quad Tracks	250 km/h (155 mph)?	23 km	2026 (Phase 1); 2028 (Phase 2)	2034
Gothenburg–Borås Double Tracks	250 km/h (155 mph)	60 km	2029–2031	2039–2041
Hässleholm–Lund Quad Tracks	250 km/h (155 mph)	60 km	No earlier than 2034 (Klostergården–Stångby)	≈2040

== Future proposals ==
The Borås–Jönköping–Linköping line of Götalandsbanan, and a Jönköping–Hässleholm line, Europabanan, giving a new national network in South Sweden, were included in the official plans investigated by the Traffic administration. They have been shelved without a set date for realisation.

A few other projects have preplanning done by the Traffic administration with an ambition by the government to build them at a future time:

- Norwegian border-Arvika together with a Norwegian project towards Oslo. Ski south of Oslo has been selected as western end point of it.
- Gävle-Sundsvall is single-track, partially from the early 20th century, partly from just after 1990. A part close to Gävle is planned to have construction start of a fast double track railway before 2030.
- Sundsvall-Härnösand, part of the coastal mainlines Stockholm-Umeå (in future to Luleå), is very curvy and buses have shorter travel time than trains. A new railway is preplanned.

Other projects are still put forward by cities and municipalities who have done preliminary investigations for these projects, without becoming a part of any national plan:

- Helsingborg-Helsingør tunnel is planned and wished by Helsingborg city with less interest from the Danish side and the Swedish government. A tunnel for long distance train traffic would need a lot of new connecting railway all the way Hässleholm-Copenhagen.
- A new railway Kristinehamn-Örebro together with doubling and straightening Kil-Kristinehamn and Örebro-Västerås is proposed by the regions and cities it passes.
- A new railway Göteborg-Uddevalla-Strömstad-Oslo is proposed by the Swedish cites and municipalities it passes.

== Travel times ==
These are realistic travel times based on the former plans to create a high speed railway network from Stockholm to Gothenburg and Malmö via Jönköping.

	Gothenburg – Stockholm	Malmö – Stockholm	Copenhagen – Stockholm	Kastrup – Arlanda
Trains (2009)	3:05	4:25	5:15	5:45
Improvements on current railways according to 2020 plans: Malmö City Tunnel (opened December 2010) – 10 min faster; 250 km/h trains (2027/2028 – SJ X250) – 15 min faster; More tracks (for higher capacity) – 10 min faster	2:40	4:00	4:40	5:10
Ostlänken (2035) and Götalandsbanan (cancelled): Stockholm to Nässjö – 45 min faster	2:15	3:15	3:55	4:25
Proposed Europabanan built	2:15	2:40	3:20	3:30
By plane, including check-in (2009): including transportation to city centres, hand luggage only, priority security check.; Kastrup-Arlanda is with checkin but without ground transportation, and is relevant for those who change plane at Kastrup which many do	2:30	2:30	2:45	1:40

== See also ==
- High-speed rail in Europe
