= Tave =

Tave or TAVE may refer to:

- TAVe, transportation project in Argentina announced in 2006, canceled in 2012
- Thor-Agena Vibration Experiment, an orbital launch in 1962
