= SJ 250 =

Swedish electric multiple unit train

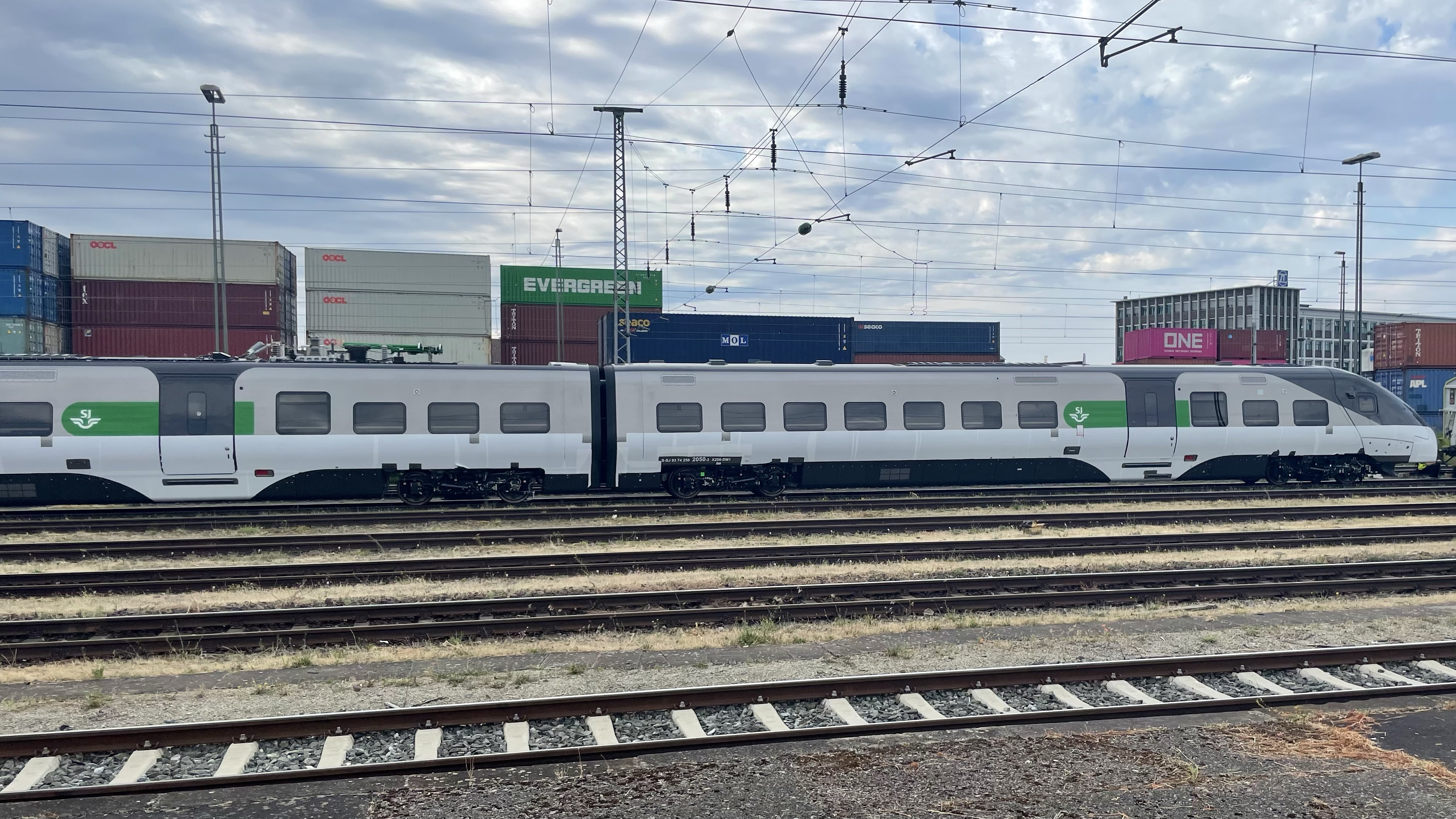
- Alstom Avelia Stream Nordic SJ 250 at Schweinfurt Hauptbahnhof, 29 June 2026
- Stock type: EMU
- Manufacturer: Alstom
- Built at: LEW Hennigsdorf (Alstom)
- Entered service: 2028 (planned)
- Number under construction: 25
- Predecessor: X 2000
- Capacity: 363 seats
- Operator: SJ AB

Specifications
- Train length: 179 m (587 ft)
- Maximum speed: 250 km/h (155 mph)
- Power supply: overhead line
- Seating: transverse
- Track gauge: 1,435 mm (4 ft 8 1/2 in)

Notes/references
- Widebody design for Sweden, Denmark, Norway

Under its Delta 2.0 project Sweden's SJ AB begin procuring Alstom Zefiro Express high-speed trains from Bombardier Transportation, during the 2020s, later rebranded as Avelia Stream Nordic by its successor Alstom.

The SJ 250 or SJ X250 electric multiple unit train fleet is planned to have fixed formations measuring up to 179 metres (590 ft) and operate at up to 250 km/h (155 mph). The trains will use the current and future high-speed rail network in Sweden, in Denmark and in Norway, in temperatures down to −40 °C (−40 °F).

SJ's aim is for these trains to replace air travel between the busiest airports in the Nordic countries—between the Scandinavian capital cities of Copenhagen, Oslo and Stockholm. Delivery of the fleet is expected during 2026‒2028. As of 2022, the planned fleet was for an order of twenty-five trains.

== Design ==
Trains will have bicycle spaces, 363 seats, and a bistro area. The front of each train will include a snowplough, with the nosecone designed for collisions with wildlife weighing up to 330 kilograms (730 lb). A backup battery is available in the event of overhead line failure. Windows will be radio-transparent to allow radio and communication signals to pass through.

== Construction ==
Carriage bodyshells are constructed in China, then shipped to Hennigsdorf in Germany. Testing and assembly is planned for the LEW Hennigsdorf site north of Berlin, which has its own track facility and train simulation facilities. Knorr-Bremse is supplying its "CubeControl" railway air brake equipment for the trains. Alstom's site in Trápaga, Spain, is supplying propulsion equipment. Doors are constructed by IFE, part of Knorr-Bremse.

The first two bodyshells arrived at Alstom's German plant in March 2025.

== Testing ==
The first train was expected to start testing during 2026, a first unit arrived at Velim test centre in Czech Republic end of July 2026.

== Funding ==
The expected price for 25 trains was SEK 7 billion (€640 million; $620 million). Contract finalisation had been delayed by a European Court of Justice ruling covering application of the Swedish Act on Procurement in the Water, Energy, Transport and Postal Services Sectors (LUF, (SFS 2016:1146), (a law based on EU directives on public procurement).

In 2023 the European Investment Bank (EIB) loaned €155 million (SEK 1.7 billon), followed by another €157 million (SEK 1.7 billion) in 2025.
