= Europabanan =

Proposed high-speed rail line in southern Sweden

Europabanan (the Europe line) is a proposed high-speed railway between Jönköping and Scania in Sweden. The speed is planned to be 320 km/h. In Jönköping it would connect to Götalandsbanan, the proposed high-speed railway Stockholm-Göteborg.

== Previous proposals ==
There is also a proposal, but no real plan, to build a railway between Helsingborg and Copenhagen, including the HH Tunnel under the Öresund. The rail track on the current Öresund bridge is congested.

Europabanan will, if built, be used for passenger trains going between Copenhagen-Stockholm, Malmö-Stockholm, Helsingborg-Stockholm, Helsingborg-Jönköping and more connections. The travel time Malmö-Stockholm is expected to be around 3 hours compared to 4.5 hours today. The travel time Helsingborg-Jönköping would be cut by 2 hours compared to today. The disadvantage with the project is the big cost.

== Feasibility study ==
There is a feasibility study ordered by the government supporting the idea about the Europabanan. The study did not include the Öresund tunnel. There is no further planning done. This is in contrast to Götalandsbanan which has a detailed plan along half its stretch and (in 2010) one being made for the rest of that railway. There is no decision to build any part of these railways.

The expected cost is at least 40 billion SEK for Europabanan, not counting the connection to Denmark, an amount that caused political hesitation.

== Negotiations ==
In February 2016 negotiations were started with municipalities for financing a high-speed rail between Stockholm and Malmö, with stations in Jönköping, Värnamo, Hässleholm and Lund.

== After 2020 ==
The plan for both Götalandsbanan (Borås-Linköping part of a new railway Stockholm-Göteborg) and Europabanan (Jönköping-Helsingborg) have basically been shelved until future. It is possible that they will be built but then in a more distant future.

The plan as of 2025 is to use the existing railway Södra Stambanan Stockholm-Malmö and to extend it with new fast track on two parts where it is congested. The original plan included building Ostlänken Södertälje-Linköping. This railway had a construction start in 2024 and is expected to be opened in 2035. For south Sweden, the project to build two new tracks Hässleholm–Lund is politically decided and planned for construction start in 2034. Further railway projects useful for travel to/from Scania are not planned by the government as of 2025.

Both railways will increase capacity on congested stretches and reduce travel time. The Ostlänken will cut the travel time Stockholm-Malmö with around 30 minutes. The political reason to build new high-speed railways is to convince travellers to prefer trains over air for domestic travel, and for this faster travel times and capacity to handle an increased number of trains are considered needed. A decision among the government, authorities, regions and municipalities and many companies to prefer train over air for Malmö-Stockholm and shorter distances, and use online meetings, has already after 2020 reduced the number of air passengers on these routes by around half.
