= Hyderabad–Bengaluru high-speed rail corridor =

Proposed high-speed rail line in India

Hyderabad–Bengaluru High Speed Rail Corridor

Overview
- Status: Approved
- Owner: Indian Railways
- Locale: Telangana; Andhra Pradesh; Karnataka
- Termini: Hyderabad; Bengaluru
- Stations: 12 (planned)
- Website: www.nhsrcl.in

Service
- Type: High-speed rail
- Operator: National High Speed Rail Corporation Limited
- Rolling stock: E5 Series Shinkansen / BEML high-speed train

History
- Planned opening: 2051

Technical
- Line length: 618 km (384 mi)
- Character: Elevated, underground and grade-separated
- Track gauge: 1,435 mm (4 ft 8 1/2 in) standard gauge
- Electrification: 25 kV AC, 50 Hz, overhead catenary
- Operating speed: 320 km/h (200 mph)

The Hyderabad–Bengaluru High Speed Rail Corridor is an approved high-speed rail line planned to connect Hyderabad and Bengaluru in southern India. Once built, it is projected to be South India's fastest high-speed rail corridor and is planned as an extension of the Mumbai–Hyderabad high-speed line.

The National Rail Plan projected that several major Indian cities would be connected by high-speed rail by 2051, including extending the Mumbai–Hyderabad corridor to Bengaluru and linking Mumbai with Chennai.

== Stations ==
Stations along the planned alignment in the National Rail Plan high-speed rail map include: Hyderabad, Rajiv Gandhi International Airport, Bharat City, Mannanur, Kurnool, Dhone, Gooty, Anantapur, Dharmavaram, Puttaparthi, Hindupur, Alipura, Devanhalli, Kodihalli, Whitefield, and Baiyyappanahalli.

== See also ==
- High-speed rail in India
  - Chennai–Hyderabad high-speed rail corridor
  - Mumbai–Hyderabad high-speed rail corridor
  - Chennai–Mysuru high-speed rail corridor
