= Buenos Aires–Rosario–Córdoba high-speed railway =

Canceled transportation project

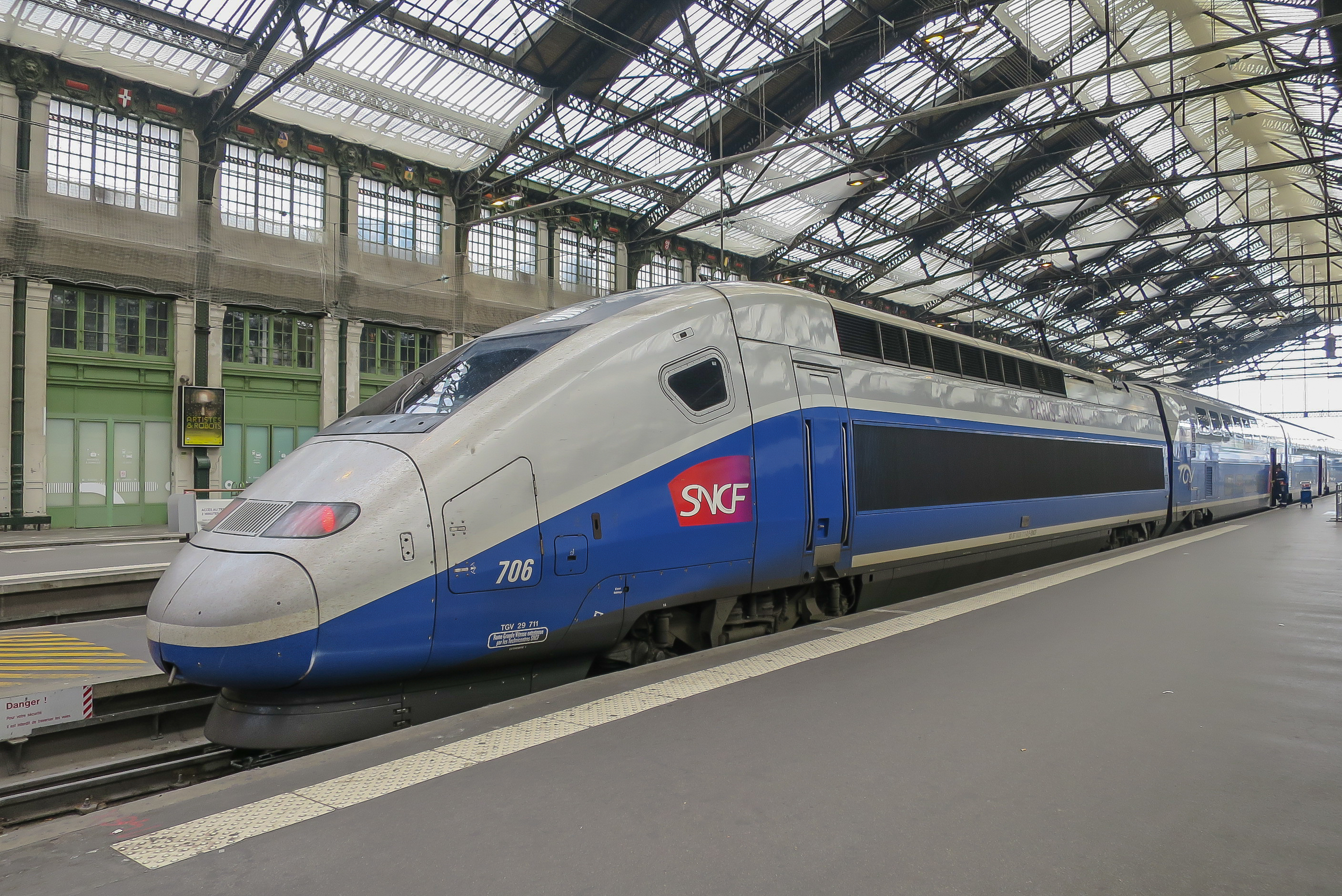
- TGV duplex of French SNCF. Similar vehicles would have been used for the TAVe

Overview
- Owner: Government of Argentina
- Area served: Buenos Aires; Santa Fe; Córdoba
- Locale: Centre and Northern Argentina
- Transit type: High-speed rail

Operation
- Began operation: No
- Operation will start: No

Technical
- System length: 710 km (440 mi)
- Track gauge: 1,676 mm (5 ft 6 in)
- Average speed: 250 km/h (160 mph)
- Top speed: 320 km/h (200 mph)
Proposed route and stations
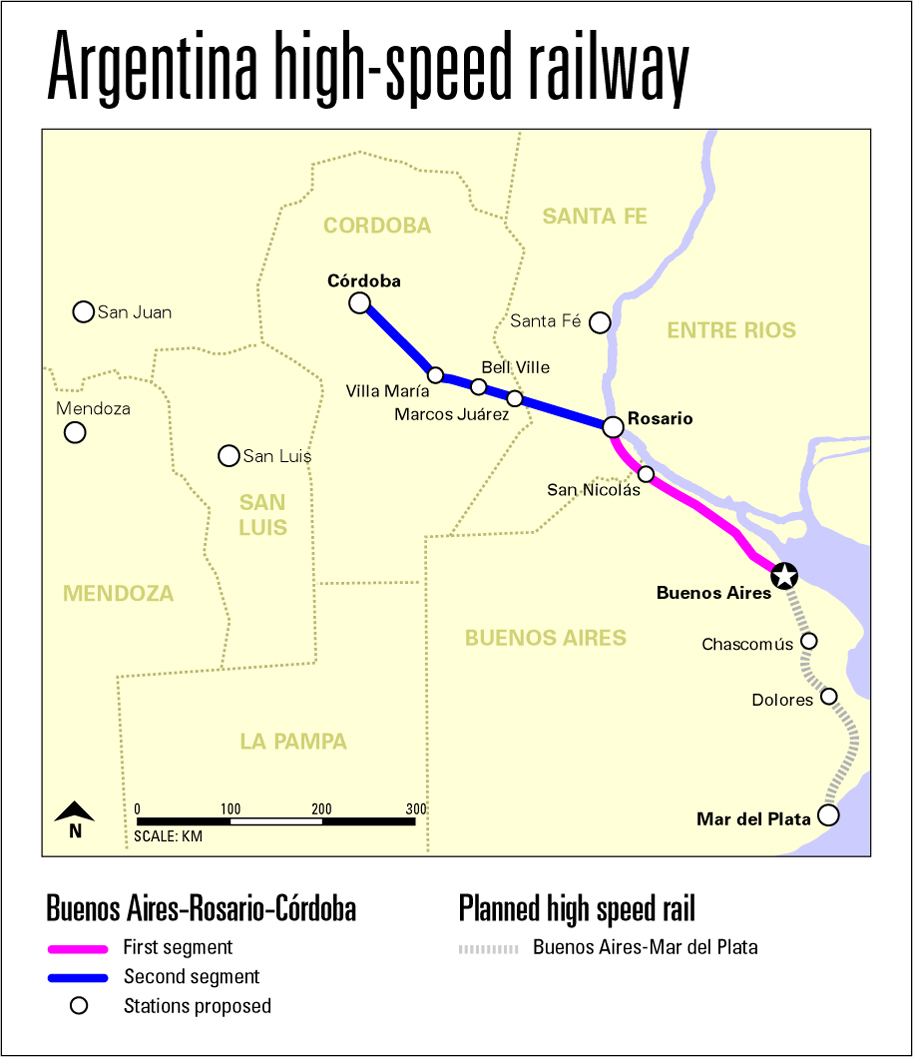

The Buenos Aires–Rosario–Córdoba high-speed railway (Spanish: Tren de Alta Velocidad de Argentina, abbreviated TAVe, also named Argentine bullet train) was a project designed to link the Argentine cities of Buenos Aires, Rosario and Córdoba through a 710 km (440 mi) high-speed rail network.

The plan, announced by then-President Néstor Kirchner during a press conference at the Casa Rosada on 26 April 2006, would have been the first not only in Argentina but in South America, operating at up to 320 km/h (200 mph). This would reduce the time of the service from 14 to 3 hours.

The entire project, which costs had been calculated in US$4 billion creating 5,000 jobs directly, was dismissed due to the 2008 financial crisis. Although French company Alstom intended to resume the project, plans for a high-speed train were definitely suspended.

== Overview ==
Buenos Aires and its metropolitan area has a population of more than 13 million, almost one third of the national total. It is the economic and political center of Argentina, and its main international entry point.

Rosario, located about 310 km (190 mi) north-northwest of the capital, is the third-largest city and a major port, with a metropolitan population of 1.3 million. It is part of the agricultural and industrial core of the littoral region.

Córdoba, with a population around 1.4 million, is located about 710 km (440 mi) from Buenos Aires, near the geographical center of Argentina. It is the second most populated metropolitan area, and a cultural, touristic, and industrial center.

Altogether, the three cities include 15 million inhabitants, or more than a third of the country's overall population of 40 million, while representing the three major cities. Rosario and Cordoba are vital centers in the farm sector, which has grown rapidly in recent years thanks to high commodity prices.

By the moment the project was announced in 2006, the main form of transportation between these three cities was by road, through National Route 9 (4 lane Highway from Buenos Aires to Rosario and 2 lane route from Rosario to Cordoba -Rosario to Cordoba highway is expected to be finished by 2009-), followed far behind by air travel. The high speed rail would act as an essential component in the revival of railways in Argentina, which would have major impact on the economic development of the region for both faster passenger and cargo connections.

=== Features ===
A high-speed electric train operating at up to 320 km/h (200 mph) with overhead catenary power lines on a standard gauge track of 1,435 mm (4 ft 8 1/2 in), it would run mainly on single-track, but with 55 km (34 mi) of double-track between Buenos Aires and Rosario to enable the nine trains/day on this section to pass one another at high speed and then to Córdoba on a new single-track alignment. Alstom was the company chosen to provide eight 509-passenger double-deck TGVs equipped with ETCS Level 2 signalling. The new line should have provided a Buenos Aires—Rosario journey time of 85 minutes (for comparison, an intercity passenger bus takes about four hours), with Córdoba reached 90 minutes later.

=== Stations ===
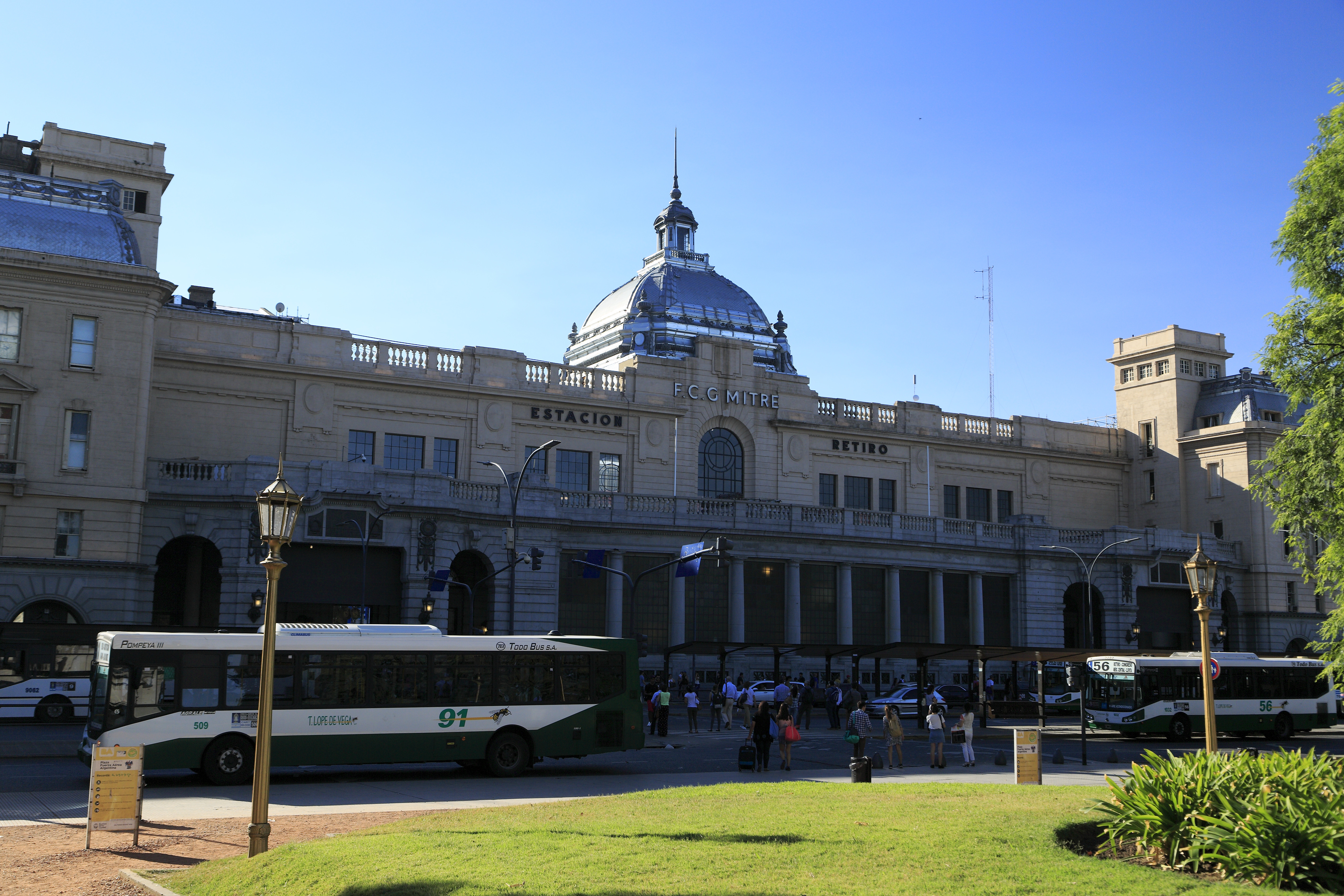
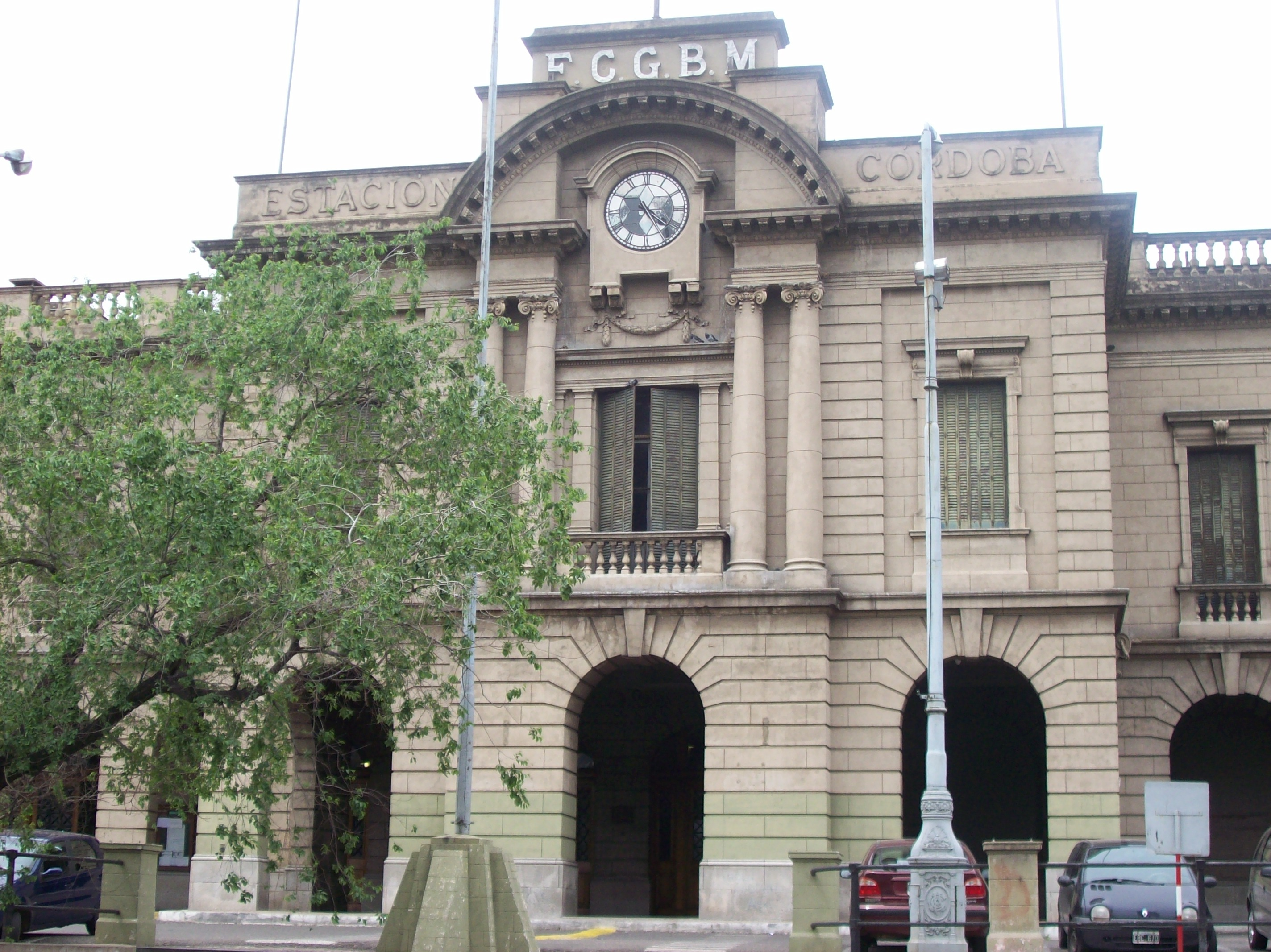
Retiro (left) and Córdoba stations were planned as termini

The new train would link the cities along the central corridor through the agricultural heartland of Argentina. According to the current plan, there will be 20 train services daily, carrying about 7,500 passengers. Several intermediate stops are planned between the main ones, most likely in the cities of Pilar, Campana, San Pedro, San Nicolás de los Arroyos, Cañada de Gómez, Marcos Juárez, Bell Ville and Villa María.

=== Bids, costs and financing ===
The total cost of the Buenos Aires—Rosario—Córdoba line was calculated at US$ 4 billion. Four European firms presented themselves as bidders: Alstom (French), Siemens (German), CAF (Spanish) and Impregilo (Italian). Pre-contractual conditions stated that the national state will pay for the whole sum, but the firm in charge of the construction will finance 50%. When technical and financial bids were due in March 2007 only the "Veloxia" grouping of Alstom, Isolux Corsan, Iecsa and Emepa Group came forward, and the consortium was selected as preferred bidder on 20 June 2007.

Veloxia was formally selected on 16 January 2008, with a contract to be signed 'in the next few months'. Alstom would supply eight double-deck TGV trains called 'Cobra'. while IECSA would undertake civil engineering, Isolux Corsan and Emepa Group would construct the track.

The Argentine state secretary of transport, Ricardo Jaime, announced on 27 March 2008 that the finance minister Martín Lousteau and the consortium led by the French company Alstom approved a resolution to finance the Buenos Aires—Rosario—Cordoba High Speed Train (TAVe). The credit line was provided by the French bank Natixis, covering 100% of the project. The financing scheme anticipates an investment of approximately A$ 12.5 billion (€2 billion or US$4 billion), to be financed with a long-term credit of 30 years that would be guaranteed with the delivery of the public titles.

The project was finally dismissed in December 2012. French company Alstom, that had been won the tender to build high-speed rail, admitted to have paid bribes to the Argentine authorities.

=== Timeline ===
- April 2006: First announcements to build a high-speed train.
- 8 May 2006: Licitation call (offerers qualification): Impregilo, Siemens, Alstom and CAF.
- 25 July 2006: Companies qualification act: Siemens, Alstom and CAF.
- August 2006: Secretariat of Transport's Resolution n° 644 notified the invitation to tender.
- 20 December 2006: Technical offers. Delayed two times until 27 March 2007: Only Alstom.
- 30 January 2007: Economic offers. Delayed two times until 30 April 2007.
- 16 January 2008: Argentina chooses Alstom-led consortium in partnership with Spanish and Argentine companies to build the first very high speed line in the Americas.
- 27 March 2008: Approval of a resolution for external financing.
- 29 April 2008: President Cristina Fernández de Kirchner formally signed a turnkey contract with the Veloxia consortium for the construction of a 320 km/h line between Buenos Aires, Rosario and Córdoba.
- 7 February 2009: Alstom CEO announces entire project "on stand-by" due to the 2008 financial crisis. Expresses optimism project will be completed in the future.
- December 2012: Minister of Transport, Florencio Randazzo, stated that "a train running to Rosario on a secure road, with a journey time of 3 hours and a half, would be enough for me", implicitly dismissing the project.

== The Mar del Plata connection ==
Other projects of high speed railway have included the 400 km (250 mi) route from Constitución station, in the central southeast part of the Buenos Aires city, to the seaside beach resort city and major fishing port of Mar del Plata. One of these projects was introduced to then governor of Buenos Aires Eduardo Duhalde in 1999 and presented by a consortium formed by companies Adtranz, Siemens, and Ferrostaal. With an estimated cost of US$600 million, trains (at an average speed of 160 km/h (99 mph)) would reach Mar del Plata within 3 hours. Other coast cities such as Pinamar, Miramar, and Necochea, would also be served by TAVe. Plans also included the total renovation of rolling stock.

In 2009, a new bidding process was launched for the Constitución–Mar del Plata line. According to the plan, the new route would enable an average speed of 250 km/h (160 mph) and a maximum of 320 km/h (200 mph). It would only have stops in Dolores and Chascomús and complete the journey to Mar del Plata in less than two hours.

Today, the service is disrupted by serious deficiencies and delays and takes over seven hours, more than the service provided in the '50s by El Marplatense with speeds of up to 90+ mph (150 km/h) making the run in 3 hrs 45 min in then cutting edge Budd Co.-built formations. The Marplatense (operated during mostly by Ferrocarriles Argentinos and then by Ferrobaires) service was ceased in 2015.

== Criticism ==
The project was heavily criticised by Poder Ciudadano, the Argentine dependency of the worldwide anti-corruption NGO Transparency International, for being disproportionately expensive relative to the number of people benefitting from it. Poder Ciudadano also expressed its disapproval at the Argentine government's diversion of funds away from the already under-funded Buenos Aires metropolitan rail-service, which is used every day by millions of citizens. . Later, when Poder Ciudadano asked for the expedient of the bidding, it was rejected in two occasions.

== See also ==
- Planned high-speed rail by country
- Rail transport in Argentina
