= Götaland Line =

Proposed high-speed railway line in Sweden

Overview
- Native name: Götalandsbanan
- Status: Göteborg-Borås, Planned. Borås-Stockholm, Cancelled
- Owner: Swedish Transport Administration
- Termini: Gothenburg Central Station; Borås

Service
- Type: High-speed rail

Technical
- Line length: 440 km (270 mi)
- Number of tracks: 2
- Track gauge: 1,435 mm (4 ft 8 1/2 in) standard gauge
- Operating speed: 250 km/h (155 mph)
- Signalling: ERTMS

The Götaland Line (Swedish: Götalandsbanan) is a planned high-speed railway planned to be built between Södertälje and Gothenburg in Sweden, past Linköping and Jönköping. The planned length is about 440 km (270 mi). The speed is planned to be 250 km/h (155 mph). The line is named after the Swedish historical region of Götaland.

It will, if built, be used for passenger trains going between Gothenburg-Stockholm, Gothenburg-Borås, Malmö-Linköping-Stockholm, Linköping-Stockholm and more connections. The travel time Gothenburg-Stockholm is expected to be 2:00 to 2:15 compared to 2:45 to 3:00 today. The travel time (Malmö-)Linköping-Stockholm would be cut by 40 min, Jönköping-Borås by 40 min and Gothenburg-Borås by 20 min. A more dense schedule is possible as well. It is also planned to have railway stations at the Göteborg Landvetter Airport and the Stockholm-Skavsta Airport. An additional objective is to free up capacity for Cargo rail on the existing rail network. The disadvantage with the project is the big cost.

== Current planning stage ==
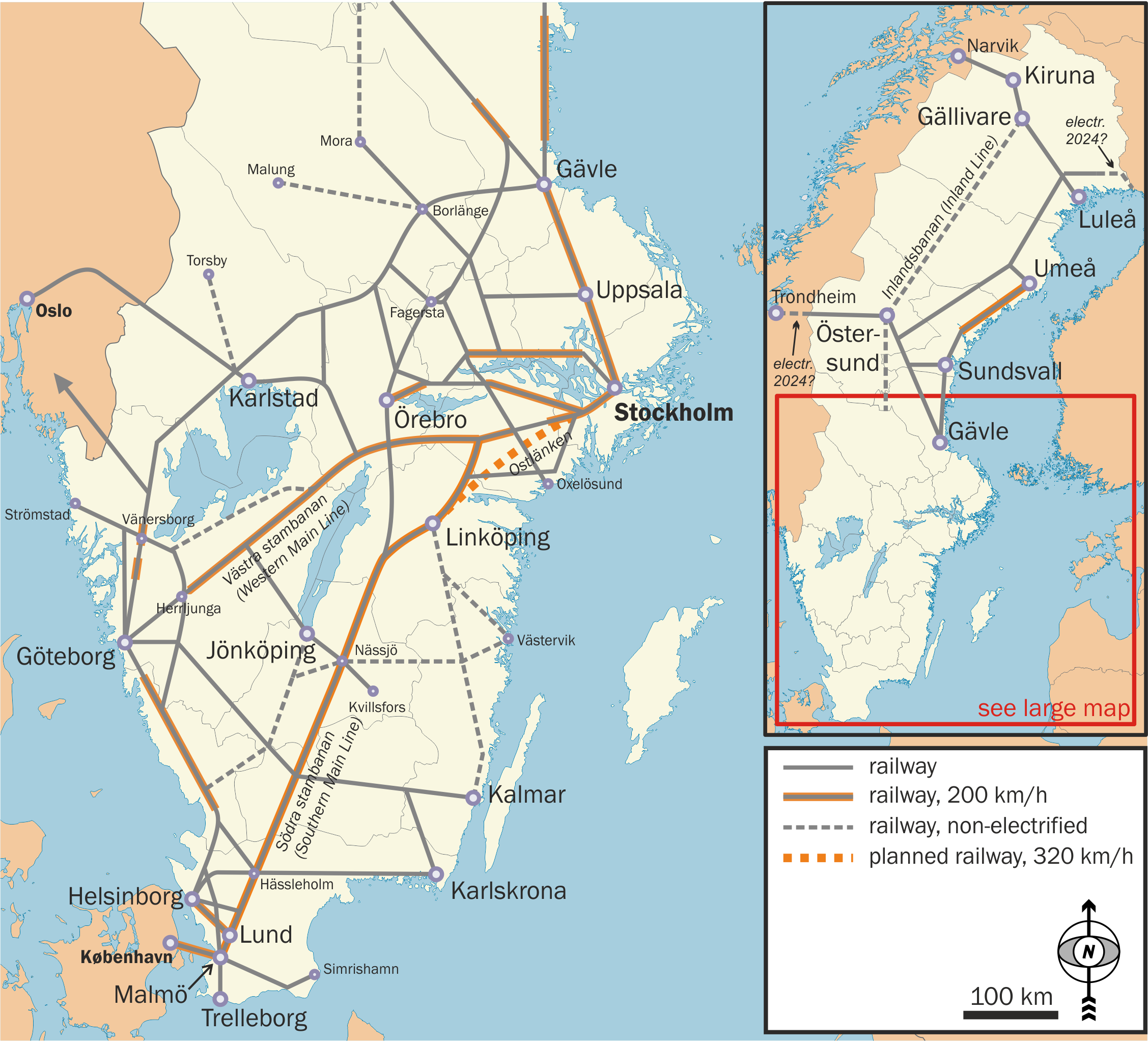
Current railway network with planned Ostlänken indicated.

The railway has a detailed plan between Gothenburg-Borås, and between Linköping-Södertälje (this part is called Ostlänken). Detailed planning is being done between Borås-Linköping. It was announced in August 2012 that the Swedish government had decided to proceed with Ostlänken. The announcement also contained details of the proposed double-tracking upgrade between Mölnlycke and Bollebygd as part of the programme, though the announcement didn't say what has happened to the original plan to build a station on the presumably-discontinued section of high-speed line between Mölnlycke and Bollebygd serving Göteborg Landvetter Airport (which is currently a few kilometres away from the existing railway line).

The railway is covered under Sverigeförhandlingen, a government negotiation process providing funding for high-speed rail projects in Sweden.

=== Gothenburg–Borås ===
The total cost of the 60 km project is 48.5 billion SEK (€5 billion) in 2021/2024 prices, with completion in 2038.

The Gothenburg–Borås railway was divided into three sections: (Gothenburg–) Almedal–Mölnlycke, Mölnlycke–Bollebygd (via Göteborg Landvetter Airport), and Bollebygd–Borås. The total cost of the project was expected to be 33 billion SEK (€3.5 billion) at 2015 price levels.

- Almedal–Mölnlycke and Bollebygd–Borås: On both sections, work on selecting a corridor in which the railway will run was expected to be finished in 2017. However, this has been affected by the work with Sverigeförhandlingen.
- Mölnlycke–Bollebygd: A corridor was selected in 2007. As of 2017, a railway plan, where the exact route will be selected, is being drafted. Originally, construction was planned to begin in 2020.

=== Borås–Linköping ===
As of 2017, a strategic choice of measures study (åtgärdsvalsstudie) for the Borås–Linköping section is expected to be finished in early 2018. An advance copy of the study was released on 15 February 2017.

Europabanan, the high-speed line to Malmö, is planned to branch from Götalandsbanan in Jönköping. In Jönköping, the railway will pass south of the city centre, where a new station will be built.

=== Linköping–Södertälje (–Stockholm) ===
As of 2017, an up to 2 km (1.2 mi) wide corridor, in which the East Link will run, has been selected. A railway plan is being drafted. Construction is expected to begin in November 2017, with the Kardon Line (Kardonbanan), a new freight line connecting Norrköping Harbour with the Southern Main Line, since the East Link will cut off the old connection. Full construction is expected to commence in 2021, with operation in 2033–2035.
