= East Link (Sweden) =

- Map of the East Link between Järna and Linköping. Existing line in grey.

Overview
- Native name: Ostlänken
- Status: Under construction
- Owner: Swedish Transport Administration
- Termini: Järna; Linköping

Service
- Type: High-speed rail

History
- Work began: 6 November 2024
- Planned opening: 2035

Technical
- Line length: 160 km (100 mi)
- Number of tracks: 2
- Track gauge: 1,435 mm (4 ft 8 1/2 in) standard gauge
- Operating speed: 250 km/h (155 mph)
- Signalling: ERTMS

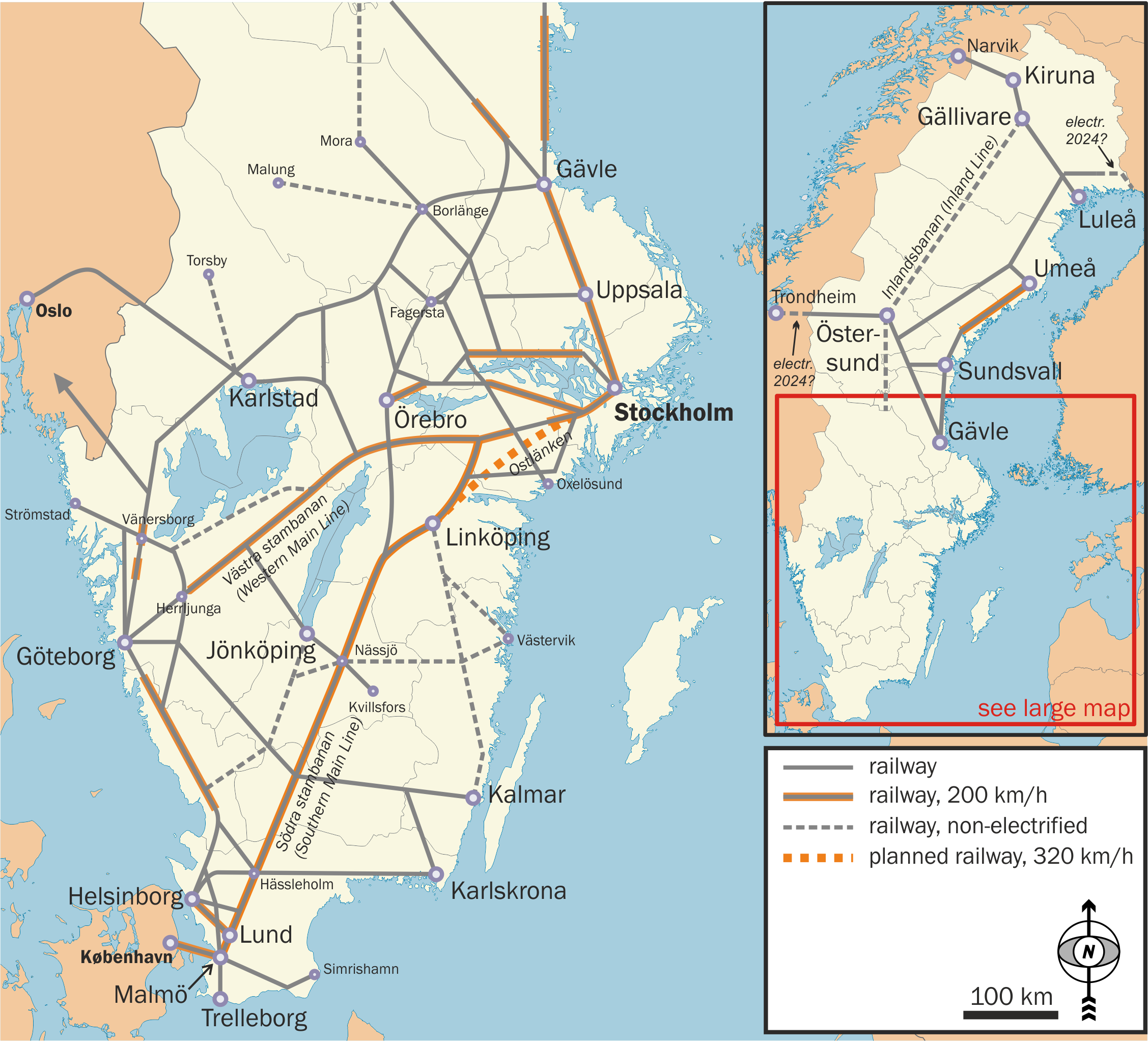
Railways in Sweden, with the planned Ostlänken indicated in orange.

The East Link (Swedish: Ostlänken) is a high-speed railway project under construction in Sweden, intended to run from Södertälje (just south of Stockholm) to Linköping.

== Background ==
The time plan was originally to start building by 2017, with the goal of trains becoming operational in 2033–2035. The construction cost for the new 160-kilometre railway was calculated to be 30 billion SEK in 2012. A detailed plan from the Swedish rail administration was published in December 2008; the Swedish government gave the go ahead in August 2012. In 2019, Swedish infrastructure manager Trafikverket commissioned Ramboll and Atkins to research and design the railway.

== Speed ==
The railway will be built to allow train speeds of 250 km/h (155 mph). It was originally planned for speeds up to 320 km/h (200 mph). In 2018, the Swedish Transport Administration decided that the line instead would be designed for speeds up to 250 km/h, citing reduced costs (by 11 billion SEK, from 65 billion to 54 billion). However, this required 1–2 years of adjusting the original plans.

== Route ==
Long-distance trains would call at Stockholm Central Station and Södertälje syd railway station before joining the new line, on which there would be an intermediate stop at Norrköping, and reach Linköping about 40 minutes faster than by the existing line. Between Södertälje and Norrköping, regional trains would make additional stops at Vagnhärad and Skavsta Airport, and make a brief detour onto the existing line to Nyköping.

== Future expansion ==
In a little more distant future, a new railway connecting Linköping-Gothenburg via Jönköping is planned, called Götalandsbanan. Together, the Ostlänken and Götalandsbanan railways would allow trains to travel between Stockholm-Gothenburg in under two hours.
