= High-speed rail in Denmark =

Completed and approved high-speed lines in Denmark.

The first high-speed railway in Denmark was the Copenhagen–Ringsted Line, completed in late 2018 and opened in 2019. Further high-speed lines are currently under planning.

Since HSR in Denmark reaches no more than 200 km/h, it can also be described as higher-speed rail.

As a part of a long-term green plan for transportation in Denmark in December 2008, the government at the time presented a high-speed strategy for the inter-city train traffic, called The Hour Model (Danish: Timemodellen). The strategy contains bringing down the travel time on the three links that connect the four largest cities of Denmark (Copenhagen-Odense-Aarhus-Aalborg) to one hour, thereby decreasing the total travel time between Copenhagen and Aalborg from approximately 4½ hours to 3 hours. The first part of the Hour Model, the new high-speed line between Copenhagen and Ringsted, opened in 2019.

After realization of the first three stages of the Hour Model, it can be expanded to Esbjerg and Herning.

On 1 March 2013, the government published their proposal for fulfilling the Hour Model, as well as an electrification of the main lines. The proposal includes creation of a DKK 27.5 billion fund, Togfonden DK (Danish: Train Fund DK), based on taxes from oil activities in the North Sea. The funding was supported by Enhedslisten and Dansk Folkeparti in a political agreement on 17 September 2013, when the potential outcome where adjusted to DKK 28.5 billion.

On 14 January 2014, the parties behind the funding published an agreement for spending the fund, where from DKK 14.8 billion will be spent for realizing the Hour Model.

== Completed projects ==
=== Øresund Fixed Link ===
The Øresund Fixed Link has 200 km/h as the permitted and used speed on the bridge and on Peberholm island, since 2000. This stretch uses Swedish railway signalling, considered easier to install and permitting higher speeds.

=== Intercity Express ===
From 2007 to 2017 ICE TD high speed trains extended the German Intercity Express service into Denmark. Routes served were Berlin-Hamburg-Copenhagen and Berlin-Hamburg-Aarhus. The trains could reach high speed only on the Berlin-Hamburg section, and would continue on regular railway lines into Denmark.

== Approved projects ==
The Hour Model will decrease travel time Copenhagen-Odense, Odense-Aarhus and Aarhus-Aalborg to one hour.

=== Hour Model ===
==== First stage: Copenhagen to Odense ====
To bring the travel time between Copenhagen and Odense down to one hour, two works are planned:

- A new 200 km/h high-speed rail line between Copenhagen and Ringsted via Køge Nord, which opened in 2019.
- Upgrading the existing rail line between Ringsted and Odense via the Great Belt Fixed Link to 200 km/h, was said to be carried out in 2022. This requires the ERTMS system which as of 2024 is planned to be installed on this stretch in two sections in 2027 and 2029.

==== Second stage: Aarhus to Aalborg ====
Like the first stage of the Hour Model, the second one also consists of two works, both in planning:

- Upgrading the existing rail line between Aalborg and Hobro to 200 km/h, expected carried out in 2024.
- Upgrading and straightening of the existing rail line between Hobro and Aarhus. Expected to be carried out from 2021. The government plan of 1 March 2013 first mentioned the speed upgrade.

DKK 4.9 billion are reserved for second stage and remaining initiatives on first stage.

==== Third stage: Odense to Aarhus ====
The central stage of the Hour Model between Odense and Aarhus is considered the most complex and most expensive to complete. Therefore, this stage was not considered realizable before 2020, now 2030.

In March 2011, the Danish Ministry of Transport published a strategic analysis of new transport connections between Copenhagen and Aarhus, including two alternative strategies for fulfilling the Hour Model between Odense and Aarhus:

- The "Little Belt - Vejle Fjord" Alignment Alternative, including new high-speed rail lines between Odense and Middelfart and between Horsens and Aarhus, as well as bypasses around Fredericia (requiring new bridge across Little Belt), Vejle (requiring new bridge across Vejle Fjord) and Horsens. The bridge/tunnel across Vejle Fjord was abandoned in 2022.
- The "Odense - Horsens" Alignment Alternative, a new high-speed rail line between Odense and Aarhus via Horsens, crossing Little Belt between Bogense and Juelsminde, either as a rail-only bridge or as a combined rail and road bridge.

The parts which have received the go-ahead so far are:

- The Vestfyn Line, a new high-speed line between Odense and Middelfart, connecting to the old Little Belt bridge. Designed for 250 km/h operation, and set to be built from 2023. This new high-speed rail line will also enable journey times between Odense and Esbjerg of 1 hour.
- New line Hovedgård-Hasselager. Designed for 250 km/h operation. Basic plan approved, final alignment pending. In 2023 it was reported that there was no longer a political majority for the project.

The sections which are still pending approval are:

- Speed upgrades Fredericia-Vejle Fjord South.
- Speed upgrades Vejle Fjord North-Hovedgård.
- Speed upgrades Hasselager-Aarhus H
- New Vejle Fjord bridge, bypassing the city.

The Vejle Fjord bridge is the main reason for approval still pending, as there is strong local opposition to the new trains bypassing the city center.

==== Journey times ====
Construction of the Hour Model will reduce the inter-city travel time as presented below:

Journey	2013	Hour Model
Copenhagen – Odense	1:15	1:00
Copenhagen – Esbjerg	3:08	2:00
Copenhagen – Horsens	2:27	1:50
Copenhagen – Aarhus	2:45	2:00
Copenhagen – Aalborg	4:21	3:00
Odense – Esbjerg	1:23	1:00
Odense – Horsens	1:10	0:50
Odense – Aarhus	1:24	1:00
Odense - Aalborg	3:04	2:00
Horsens – Aarhus	0:30	0:19
Aarhus – Aalborg	1:19	1:00

=== Femern Belt fixed link ===
Construction on the Fehmarn Belt Fixed Link began in 2020, and the tunnel is to be completed by 2029. Preparatory works began at the ground of the future tunnel element factory. The rail part of the tunnel will be designed for 200 km/h operation.

=== Fehmarn Hinterland projects ===
The treaty between Denmark and Germany for construction of the Fehmarn Belt Fixed Link includes hinterland projects in both countries. In Denmark, the existing rail line between Ringsted and Rødby is being expanded to double track and electrified, as well as upgraded to 200 km/h. The Storstrøm Bridge was originally supposed to remain as single track, however a political agreement confirms funding the design of a new combined rail and road bridge across Storstrømmen. The railway on the new Storstrøm Bridge is scheduled to open in 2027.

With the opening of the fixed link, hourly Intercity-Express trains between Copenhagen and Hamburg will be introduced. The Travel time will be reduced from approx. 4,5 hours to less than 2.5 hours for the fastest trains.

The fixed link, as well as the hinterland projects, are expected to be completed by 2029.

== Technical aspects ==
=== Signalling ===
Railways in Denmark use a system for cab signalling which is unique, but is based on the system in Switzerland. The system allows 180 km/h maximum speed in Denmark (200 in Switzerland). 5 km of the Øresund Line closest to the border uses Swedish signalling and permits 200 km/h.

In order to allow modernization of the Danish railway network, Banedanmark are rolling out European Rail Traffic Management System (ERTMS) Level 2 on all national rail lines between 2018 and 2030, a project called the Signalling Programme. The project was tendered out in four contracts:

- National rail lines east of Little Belt Bridge, won by Alstom
- National rail lines west of Little Belt Bridge, won by Thales-BBR consortium
- S-train signalling system (CBTC), won by Siemens
- On-board equipment, won by Alstom

=== Electrification ===
Most of the InterCity train traffic in Denmark is currently operated using the diesel powered IC3 stock. Only the main line between Malmö (Sweden) and Flensburg (Germany)/Esbjerg via Copenhagen, Odense and Kolding, as well as the spur between Tinglev and Sønderborg, the line between Copenhagen and Helsingør and the line between Ringsted and Næstved (part of the Fehmarn Hinterlands projects) are electrified. To replace the IC3 stock, operator DSB ordered 83 IC4 high-speed diesel trains (200 km/h operating speed) at AnsaldoBreda. Electrification of the main lines is appointed the solution to the future InterCity traffic.

On 7 February 2012 a large majority in the Danish parliament reached a political agreement on electrifying the main line between Lunderskov and Esbjerg and produce a feasibility study for electrifying several other main lines. In the Finance Act of Denmark 2013, electrification of the railway between Køge North and Næstved are financed.

On 1 March 2013, DKK 8.7 billion was reserved for electrifying the main lines Fredericia – Frederikshavn, Roskilde – Kalundborg and Vejle – Struer. The electrification will be completed no later than 2025.

In May 2015, an estimated DKK 2.8 billion deal was made.

=== New electric trainsets ===
In June 2021, DSB signed a contract with Alstom over the delivery of approximately 150, but at least 100, electric multiple unit trainsets of the type Alstom Coradia Stream. They will be delivered starting 2027 and have a top speed of 200 km/h.

The Talgo 230 cars that DSB have bought are also limited to 200 km/h.

== Proposed lines ==
Beside the Hour Model, additional high-speed rail lines in Denmark are discussed as a part of fixed link projects.

=== Fixed link across Kattegat ===
The strategic analysis of new transport connections between Copenhagen and Aarhus included a third alternative for decreasing the travel time between the two cities: a new fixed link across Kattegat. This requires a new high-speed rail line between Roskilde and Aarhus via Kalundborg and Samsø. This solution will lower the travel time between Copenhagen and Aarhus to one hour, but not affect the travel time between Odense and Aarhus.

Since 2008 a new fixed link across Kattegat has been discussed widely in Denmark, as a visionary expansion of the overall infrastructure in Denmark, and several analysis (both official and by lobbyists) have been published.

=== Second Øresund Fixed Link ===
As connection to a second fixed link across Øresund between Elsinore and Helsingborg, wanted by the Swedish Government, a new high-speed rail line might be constructed. Most studies are describing a new transport corridor around Copenhagen (Ring 5), while some transport researchers are suggesting a new high-speed rail line between Elsinore and Copenhagen along the current motorway.

The development project Scandinavian 8 Million City has proposed a 360 km/h (225 mph) high speed rail line from Oslo via Gothenburg to Copenhagen, which is supported by the mayors of the three cities. The governments do not support the idea in the short or medium term, as they are assumed to pay for this more than €10 billion project.

=== Other upgrades ===
The lines to Esbjerg and to the border at Flensburg are planned to be upgraded to 200 km/h most of their routes before 2030, mainly based on installation of ERTMS.

== See also ==
- Transportation in Denmark
- Rail transport in Denmark
