= Railway signal =

Visual signal device for railway engineers

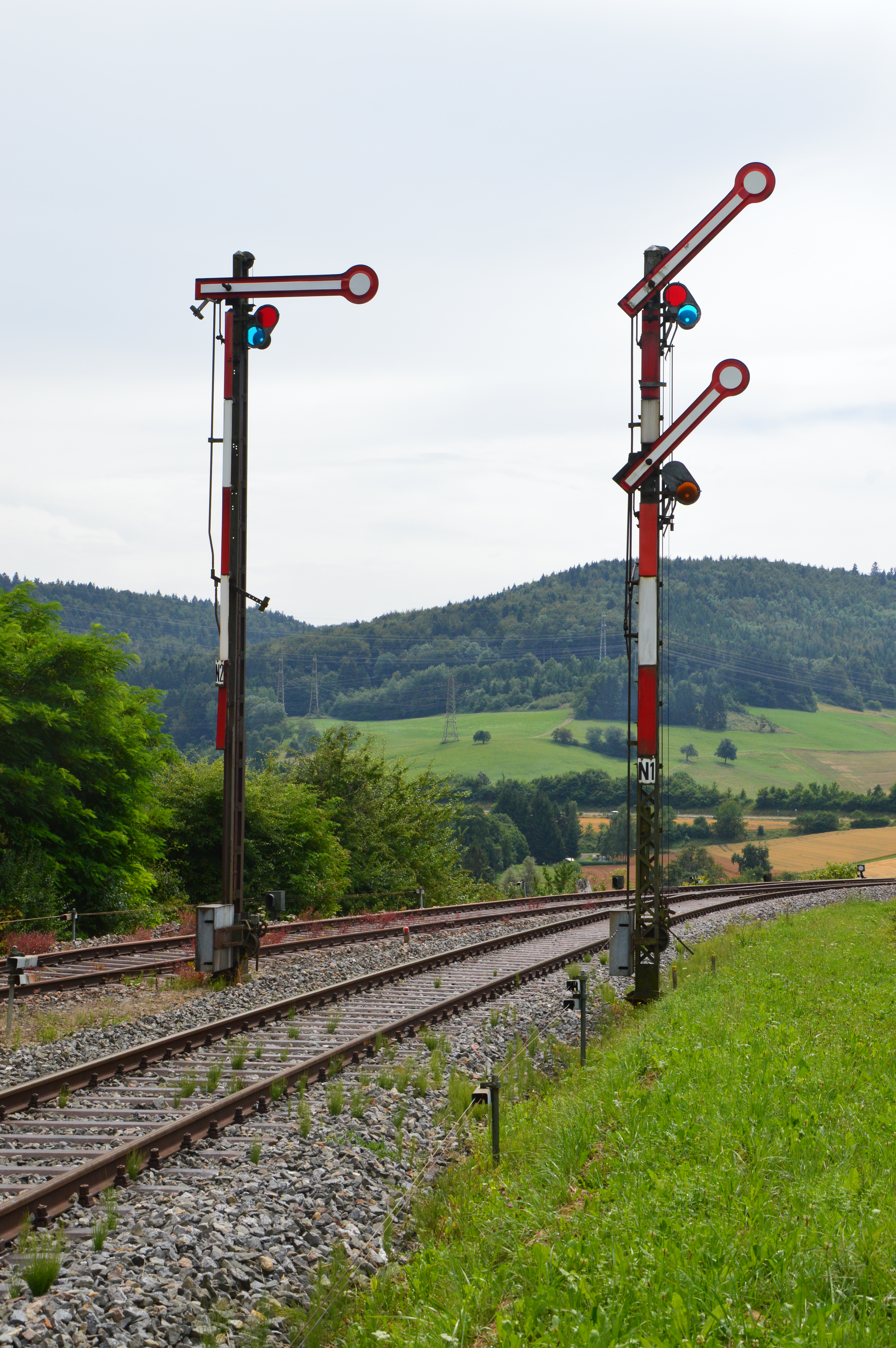
Semaphore signals (Germany)

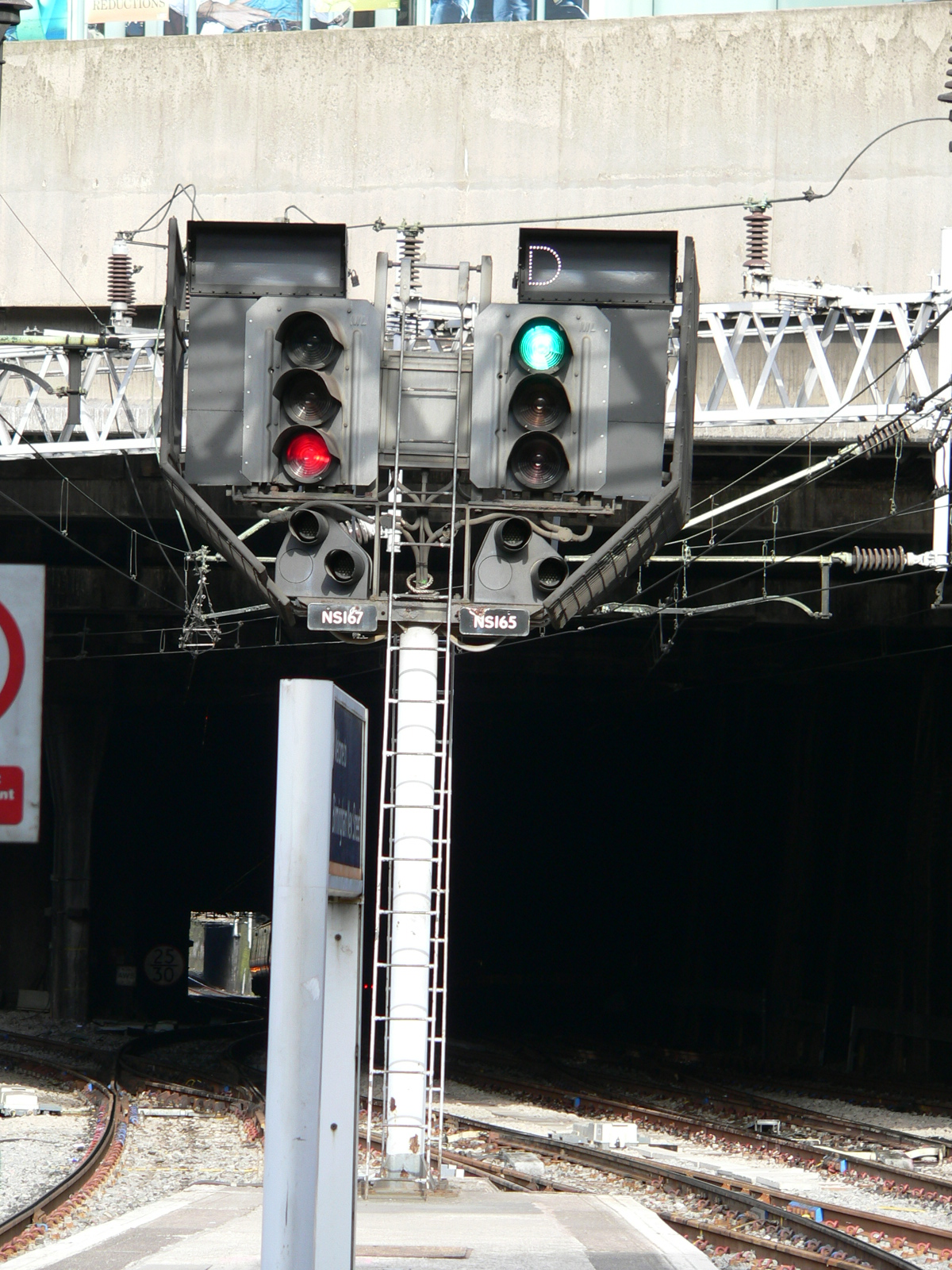
Colour-light signals
(Great Britain)

Two common types of signal. In both cases, the left signal shows "danger".

A railway signal is a visual display device that conveys instructions or provides warning of instructions regarding the driver's authority to proceed. The driver interprets the signal's indication and acts accordingly. Typically, a signal might inform the driver of the speed at which the train may safely proceed or it may instruct the driver to stop.

== Application and positioning of signals ==
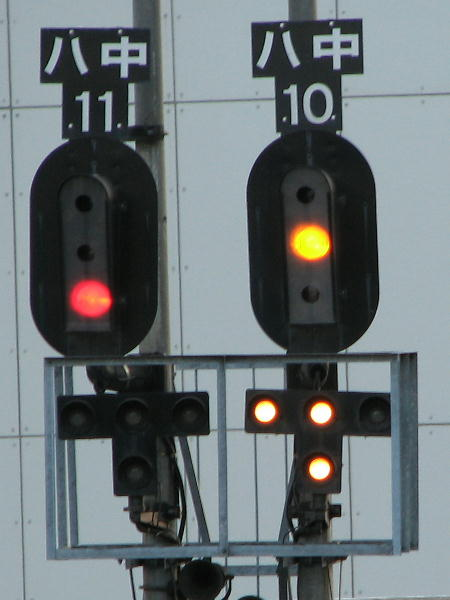
The additional lights on Japanese signal 10 show that the points are set for the left route at the next junction.

Originally, signals displayed simple stop or proceed indications. As traffic density increased, this proved to be too limiting and refinements were added. One such refinement was the addition of distant signals on the approach to stop signals. The distant signal gave the driver warning that they were approaching a signal which might require a stop. This allowed for an overall increase in speed, since train drivers no longer had to drive at a speed within sighting distance of the stop signal.

Under timetable and train order operation, the signals did not directly convey orders to the train crew. Instead, they directed the crew to pick up orders, possibly stopping to do so if the order warranted it.

Signals are used to indicate one or more of the following:

- That the line ahead is clear (free of any obstruction) or blocked
- That the driver has permission to proceed
- That points (also called switch or turnout in the US) are set correctly
- Which way points are set
- The speed the train may travel
- The state of the next signal
- That the train orders are to be picked up by the crew

=== Early signal systems ===
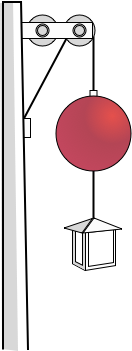
Ball signal (USA, 1830) at "high ball"

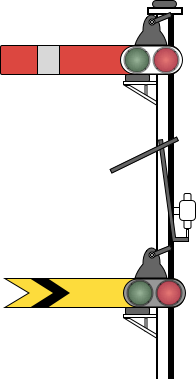
British semaphore signal（1940）

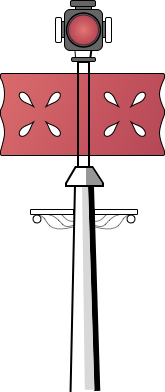
Wood's crossbar signal (1830)

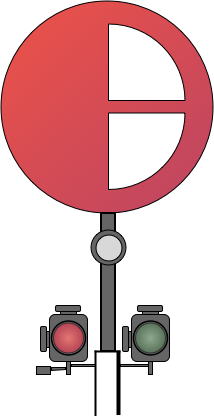
Revolving disc signal (1840)

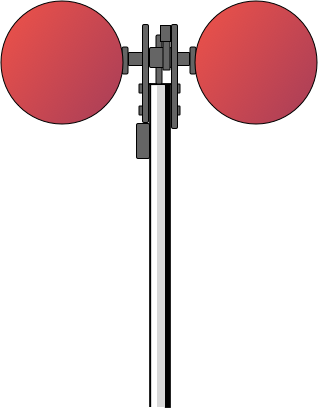
Double disc signal (1846)

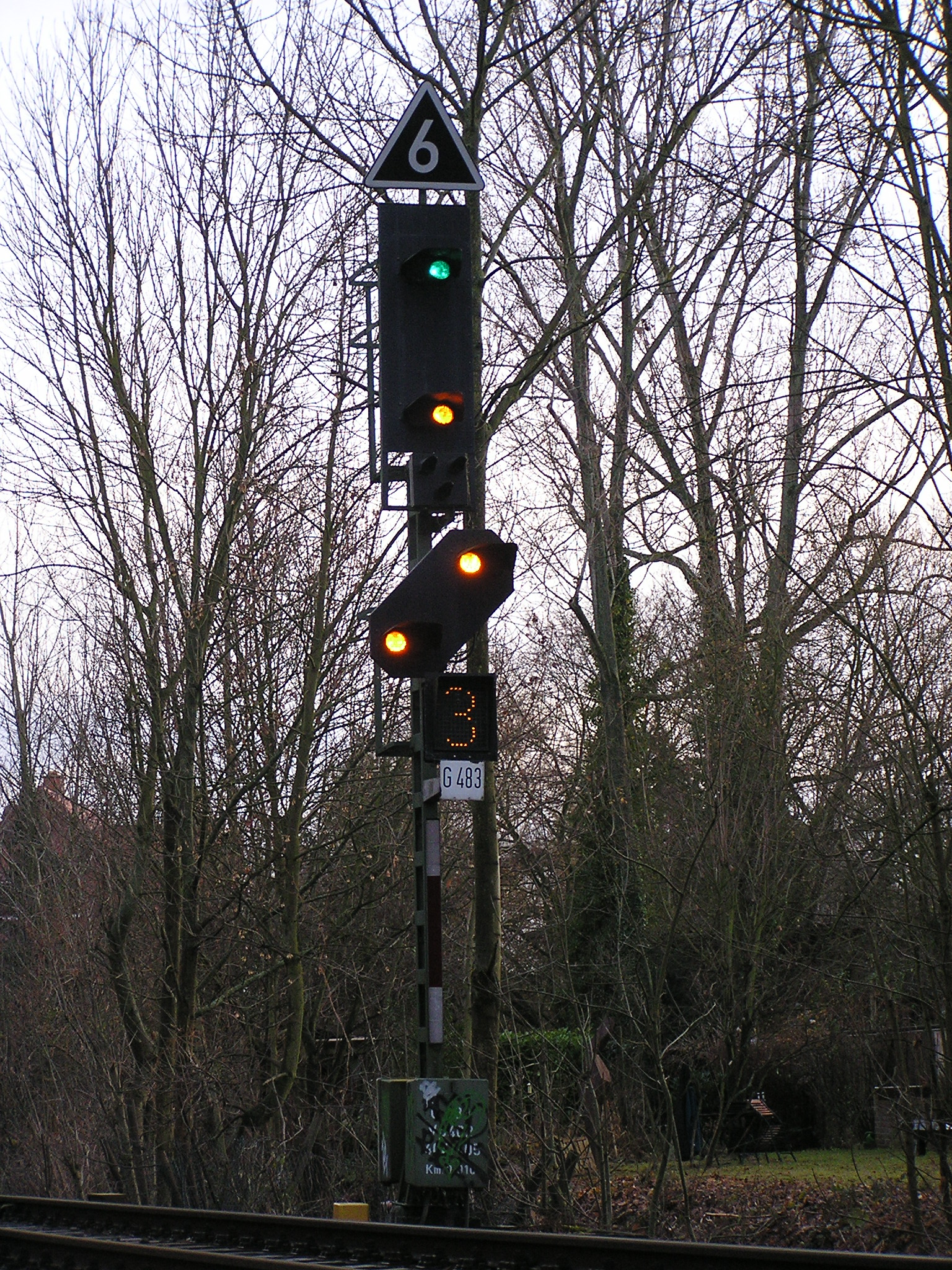
Some signals convey large amounts of information. This older German signal indicates preliminary caution with max. 60 km/h in the upper main signal aspect (green above yellow, number plate "6") and caution in the lower distant aspect. The lower yellow number indicator announces a speed limit of 30 km/h by displaying "3". At that specific station the selected route ends on a stub track, thus distant caution with additional speed limits.

Signals can be placed:

- At the start of a section of track
- On the approach to a movable item of infrastructure, such as points or switches or a swingbridge
- In advance of other signals
- On the approach to a level crossing
- At a switch or turnout
- Ahead of platforms or other places that trains are likely to be stopped
- At train order stations

'Running lines' are usually continuously signalled. Each line of a double track railway is normally signalled in one direction only, with all signals facing the same direction on either line. Where bidirectional signalling is installed, signals face in both directions on both tracks (sometimes known as 'reversible working' where lines are not normally used for bidirectional working). Signals are generally not provided for controlling movements within sidings or yard areas.

== Aspects and indications ==
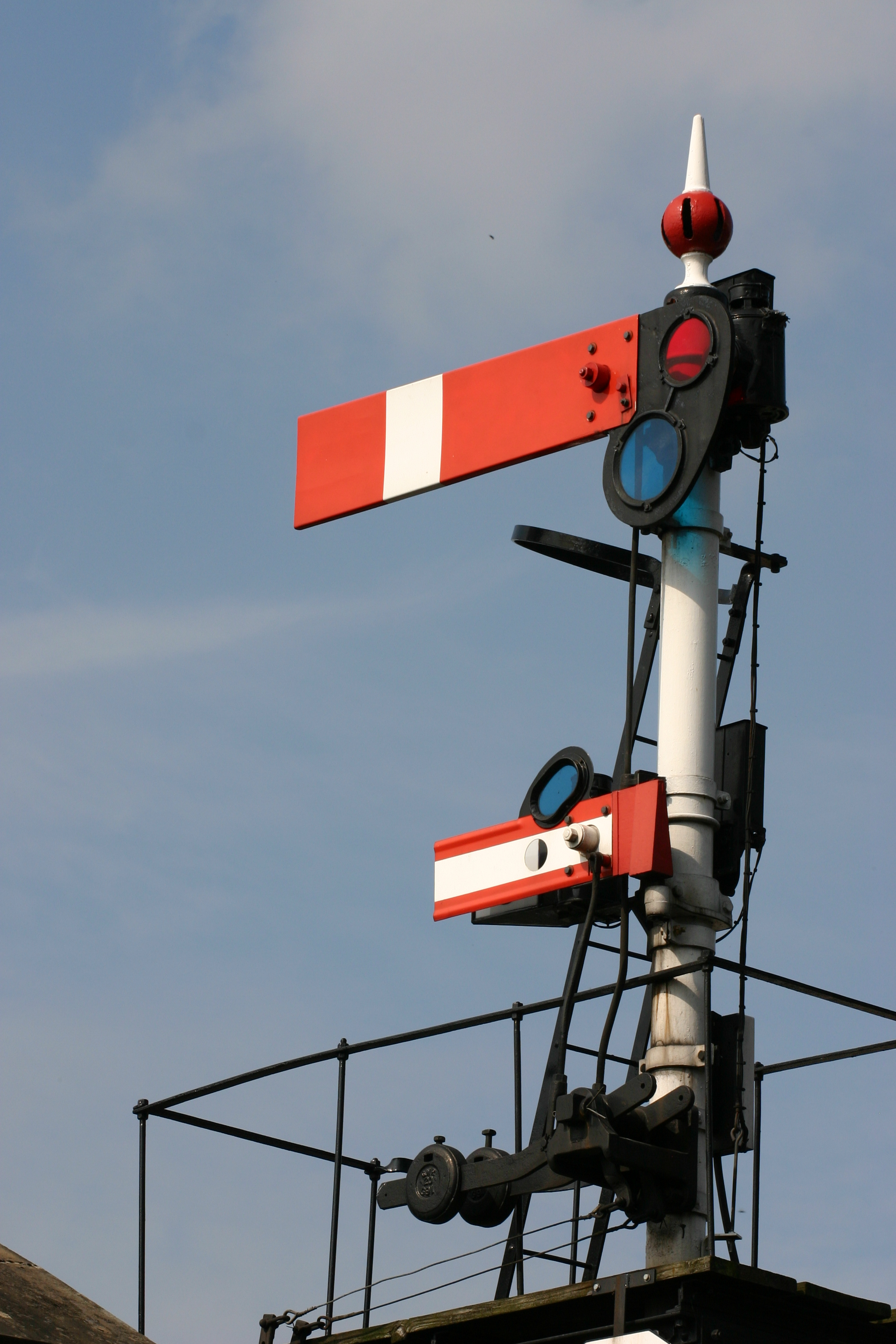
A British lower-quadrant semaphore stop signal with subsidiary arm below

Signals have aspects and indications. The aspect is the visual appearance of the signal; the indication is the meaning. In American practice the indications have conventional names, so that for instance "Medium Approach" means "Proceed at not exceeding medium speed; be prepared to stop at next signal". Different railroads historically assigned different meanings to the same aspect, so it is common as a result of mergers to find that different divisions of a modern railroad may have different rules governing the interpretation of signal aspects. For example, stop aspect refers to any signal aspect that does not allow the driver to pass the signal.

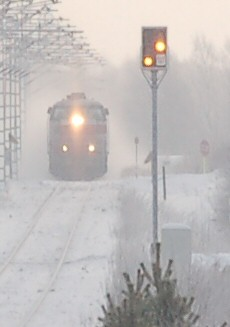
A Finnish distant signal at the western approach to Muhos station is displaying Expect Stop. In the background, express train 81 is pulling away from the station.

Signals control motion past the point at which the signal stands and into the next section of track. They may also convey information about the state of the next signal to be encountered. Signals are sometimes said to "protect" the points or switches, section of track, etc. that they are ahead of. The term "ahead of" can be confusing, so official UK practice is to use the terms in rear of and in advance of. When a train is waiting at a signal it is "in rear of" that signal and the danger being protected by the signal is "in advance of" the train and signal.

In North American practice, a distinction must be made between absolute signals, which can display a "Stop" (or "Stop and Stay") indication, and permissive signals, which display a "Stop & Proceed" aspect. Furthermore, a permissive signal may be marked as a Grade Signal where a train does not need to physically stop for a "Stop & Proceed" signal, but only decelerate to a speed slow enough to stop short of any obstructions. Interlocking ('controlled') signals are typically absolute, while automatic signals (i.e. those controlled through track occupancy alone, not by a signalman) are usually permissive.

Drivers need to be aware of which signals are automatic. In current British practice for example, automatic signals have a white rectangular plate with a black horizontal line across it. In US practice a permissive signal typically is indicated by the presence of a number plate. In the Australian states of New South Wales, Victoria and South Australia, as well as New Zealand, a permissive signal has the lower set of lights offset (usually to the right) from the upper lights; in Victoria and New Zealand, an absolute signal displaying a red or white "A" light is also treated as a permissive signal. Some types of signal display separate permissive and absolute stop aspects. In Germany, the rules which apply to the respective signal are indicated by a vertical plate on the signal's post (Mastschild).

Operating rules normally specify that a signal with an abnormality, such as one with an extinguished lamp or an entirely dark signal, must be interpreted as the most restrictive aspect – generally "Stop" or "Stop and Proceed".

== Signal forms ==
Signals differ both in the manner in which they display aspects and in the manner in which they are mounted with respect to the track.

=== Mechanical signals ===
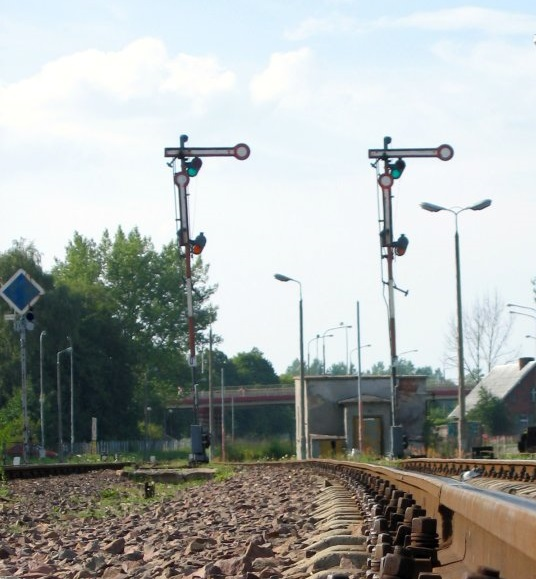
Mechanical semaphore signals at Kościerzyna in Poland

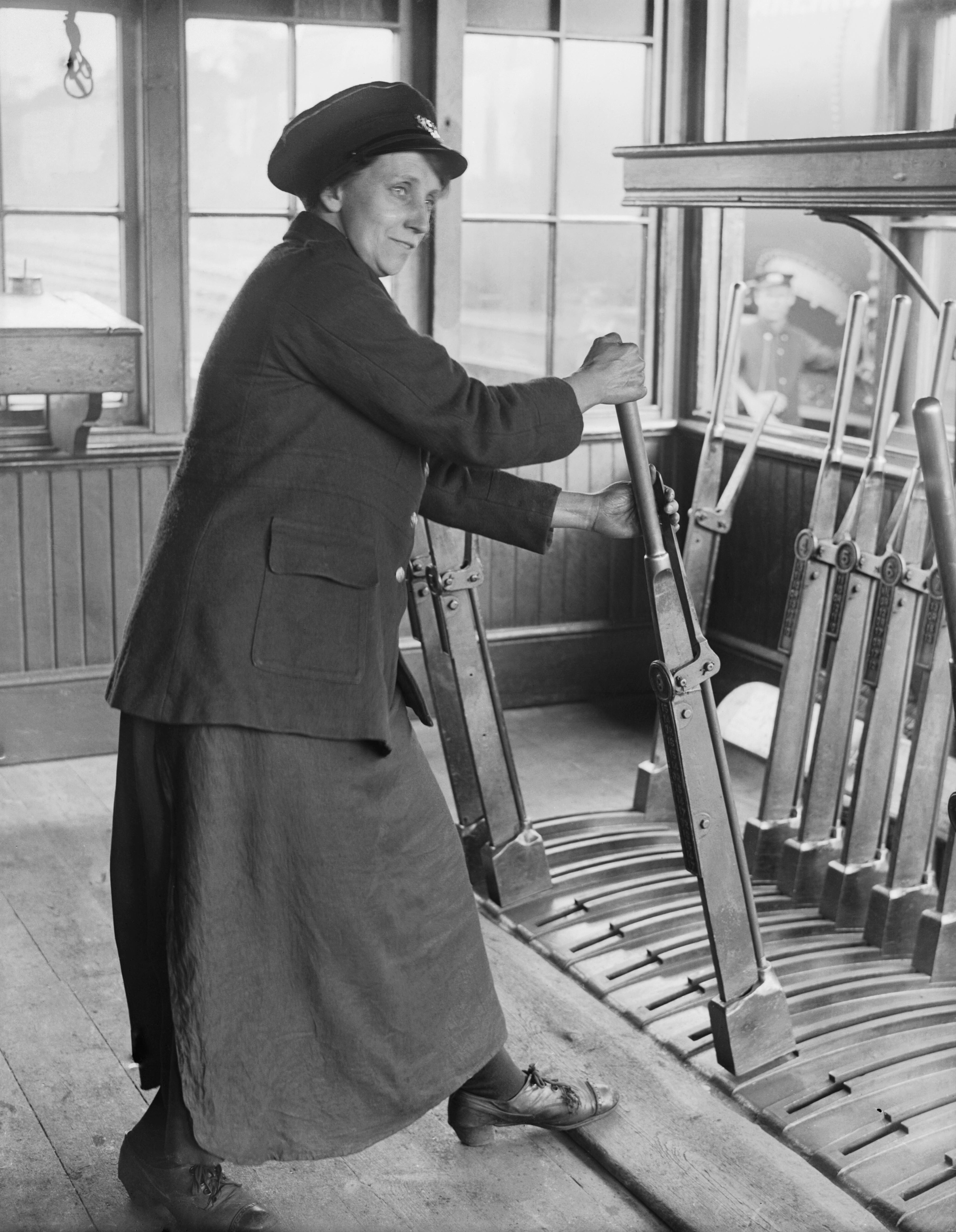
A signaller operating mechanical signals in a siding on the Great Central Railway, 1918

The oldest forms of signal displays their different indications by a part of the signal being physically moved. The earliest types comprised a board that was either turned face-on and fully visible to the driver, or rotated away so as to be practically invisible. These signals had two or at most three positions.

Semaphore signals were developed in France at the end of the 18th century, before being later adopted by the railways. The first railway semaphore was erected by Charles Hutton Gregory on the London and Croydon Railway (later the Brighton) at New Cross Gate, southeast London, in 1841. It was similar in form to the optical telegraphs then being replaced on land by the electric telegraph. Gregory's installation was inspected and approved for the Board of Trade by Major-General Charles Pasley. Pasley had invented a system of optical telegraphy through semaphores in 1822 for the British military, and appears to have suggested to Gregory the application of the semaphore to railway signaling. The semaphore was afterwards rapidly adopted as a fixed signal nearly universally. Disc signals, such as those made by the Hall Signal Company, were sometimes used, but semaphores could be read at much longer distances. The invention of the electric light, which could be made brighter than oil lamps and hence visible both by night and day, resulted in the development of position light signals and colour-light signals at the beginning of the 20th century, which gradually displaced semaphores. A few remain in modern operations in the United Kingdom.

Mechanical signals may be operated manually, connected to a lever in a signal-box, by electric motors, or hydraulically. The signals are designed to be fail-safe so that if power is lost or a linkage is broken, the arm will move by gravity into the horizontal position.

In the U.S., semaphores were employed as train order signals, with the purpose of indicating to engineers whether they should stop to receive a telegraphed order, and also as simply one form of block signalling.

=== Colour light signals ===
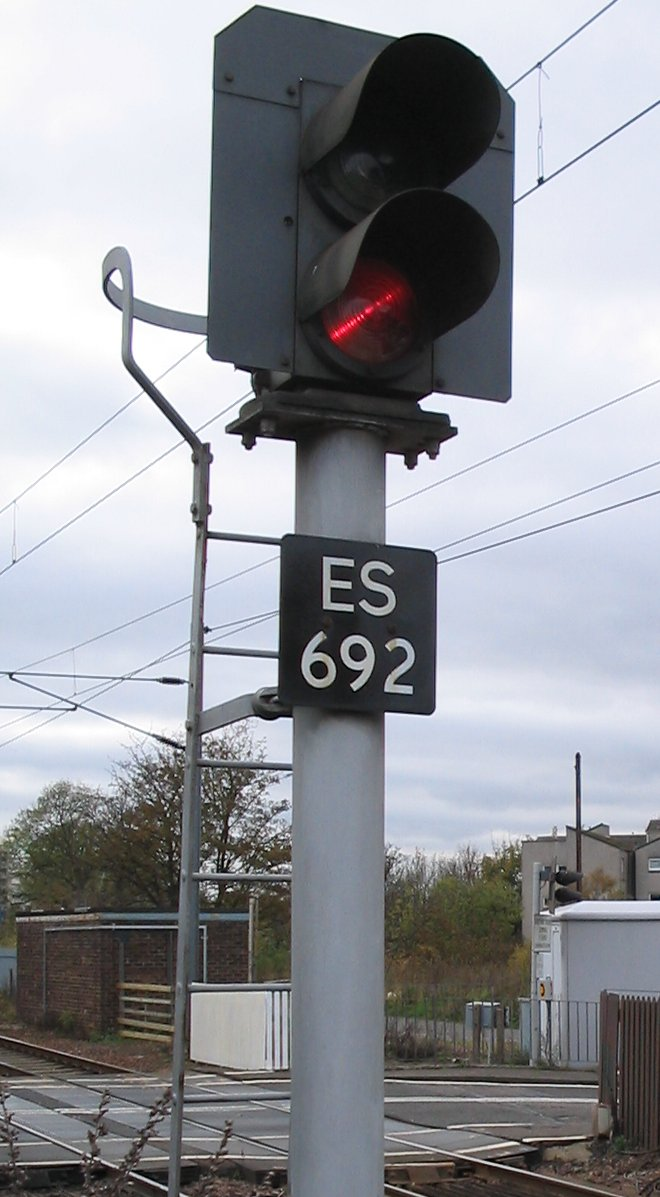
Network Rail (UK) two-aspect colour light railway signal set at 'danger'

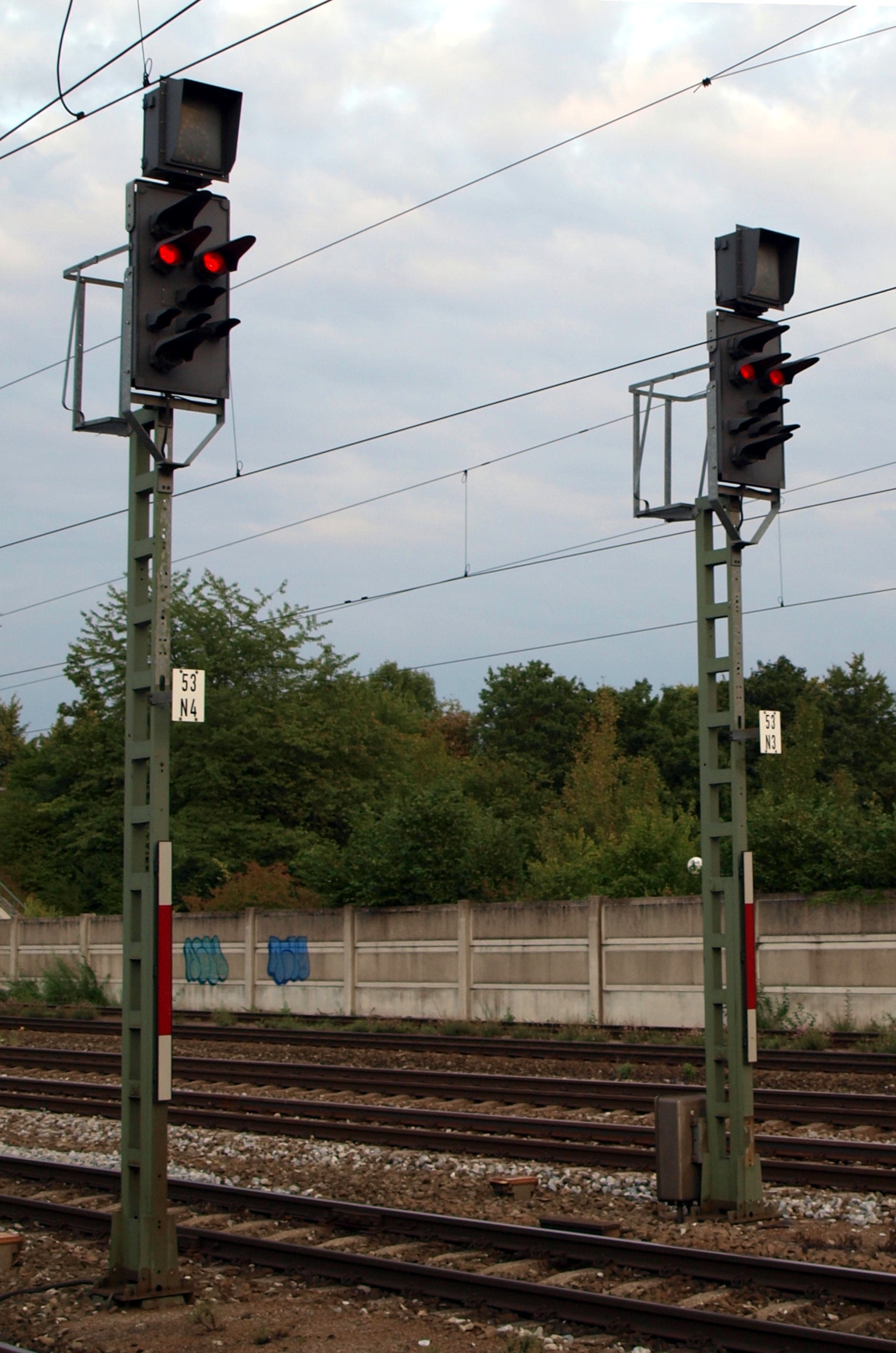
German railway signals showing aspect Hp0 (Stop)

The introduction of electric light bulbs made it possible to produce colour light signals which were bright enough to be seen during daylight, starting in 1904.

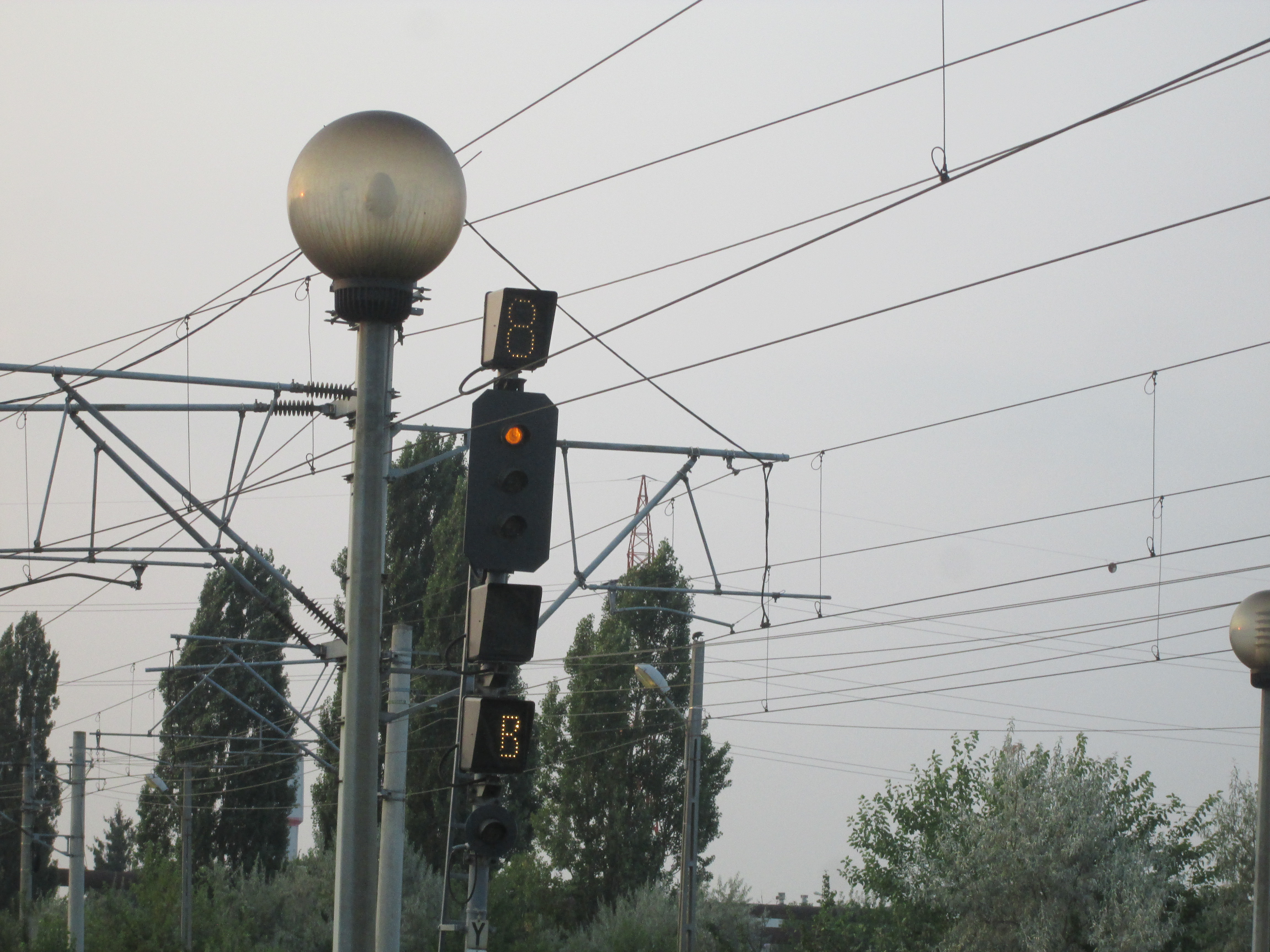
Railway signal in Ploiești West railway station, Romania. This type of signal is based on the German Ks signals.

The signal head is the portion of a colour light signal which displays the aspects. To display a larger number of indications, a single signal might have multiple signal heads. Some systems used a single head coupled with auxiliary lights to modify the basic aspect.

Colour light signals come in two forms. The most prevalent form is the multi-unit type, with separate lights and lenses for each colour, in the manner of a traffic light. Hoods and shields are generally provided to shade the lights from sunlight which could cause false indications.

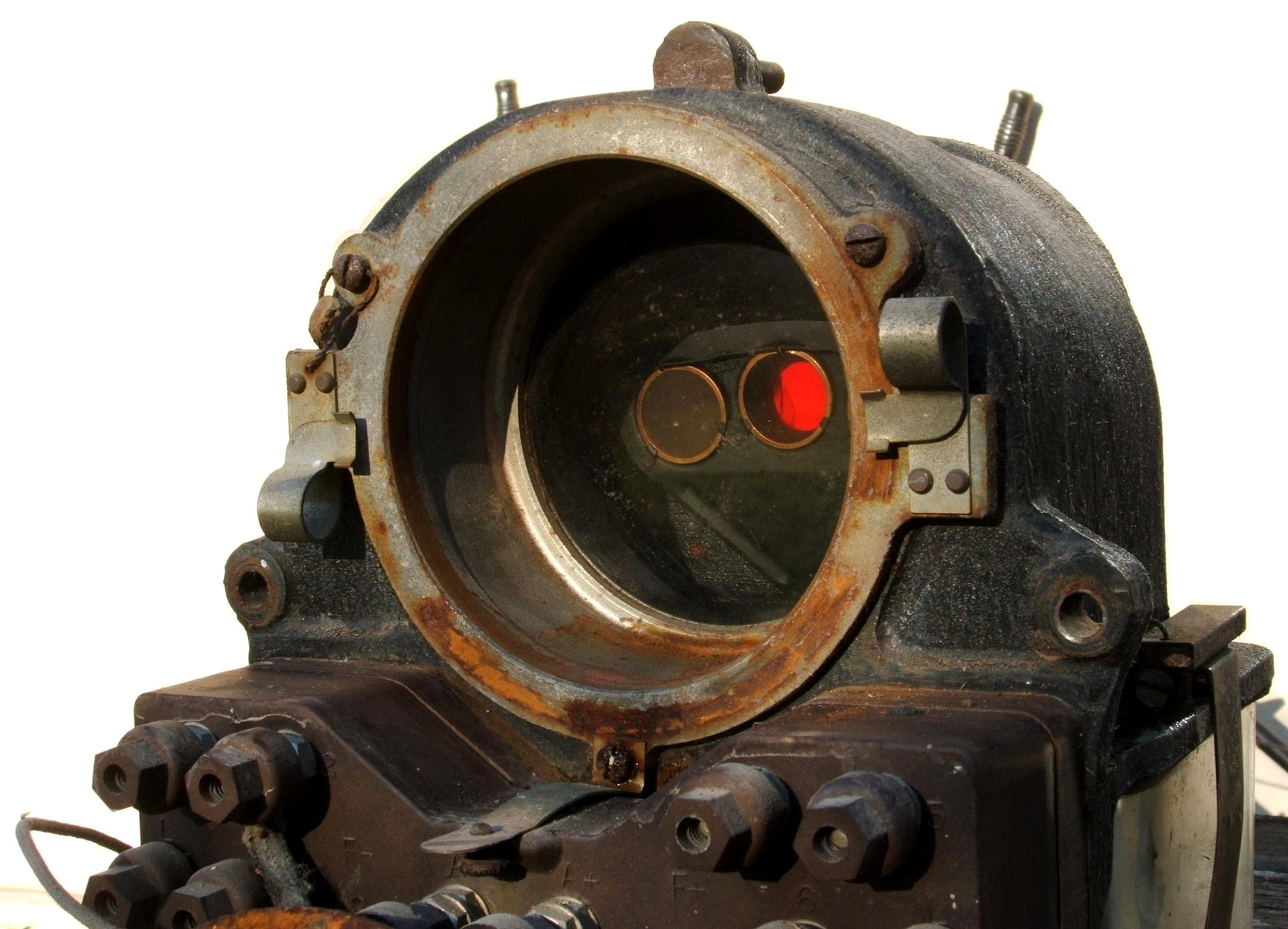
Mechanism of a searchlight signal made by Union Switch & Signal, with the lamp and reflector removed to expose the coloured roundels

Searchlight signals were the most often used signal type in the U.S. until recently. In these, a single incandescent light bulb is used in each head, and either an A.C. or D.C. relay mechanism is used to move a coloured spectacle (or "roundel") in front of the lamp. In this manner, gravity (fail safe) returns the red roundel into the lamp's optical path. In effect, this mechanism is very similar to the colour light signal that is included in an electrically operated semaphore signal, except that the omission of the semaphore arm allows the roundels to be miniaturized and enclosed in a weatherproof housing. Widely used in the U.S. from World War II onward, searchlight signals have the disadvantage of having moving parts which may be deliberately tampered with. This had led to them becoming less common during the last fifteen to twenty years when vandalism began to render them vulnerable to false indications.

However, in some other countries, such as on the Italian railways (FS) as from the Regolamento Segnali, they are still the standard colour light signal albeit with new installations being as outlined below.

More recently, clusters of LEDs have started to be used in place of the incandescent lamps, reflectors and lenses. These use less power and have a purported working life of ten years, but this may not in reality be the case.

Operating rules generally dictate that a dark signal be interpreted as giving the most restrictive indication it can display (generally "stop" or "stop and proceed"). Many colour light systems have circuitry to detect such failures in lamps or mechanism.

=== Position light signals ===
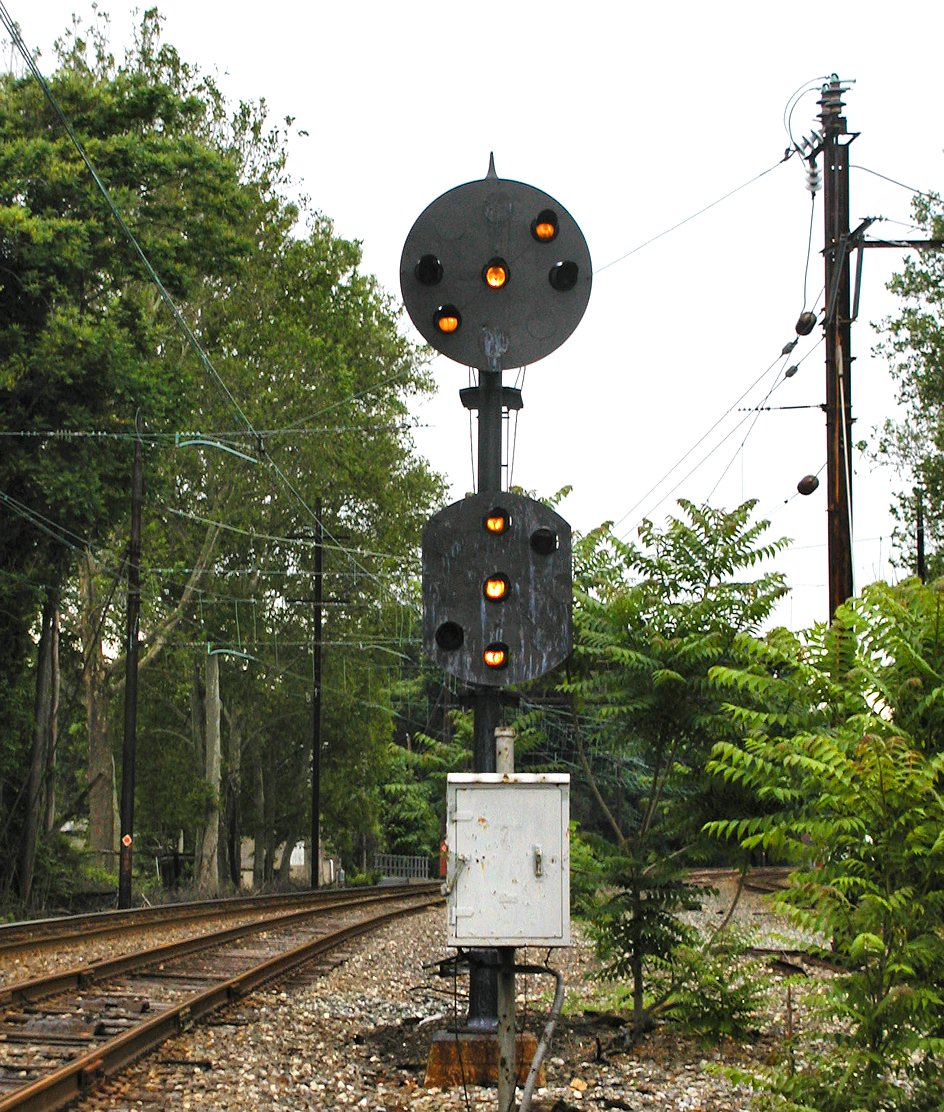
PRR position light signal showing "Approach Medium"

A position light signal is one where the position of the lights, rather than their colour, determines the meaning. The aspect consists solely of a pattern of illuminated lights, which are all of the same colour. In many countries, small position light signals are used as shunting signals, while the main signals are of colour light form. Also, many tramway systems (such as the Metro of Wolverhampton) use position light signals.

=== Colour-position signals ===
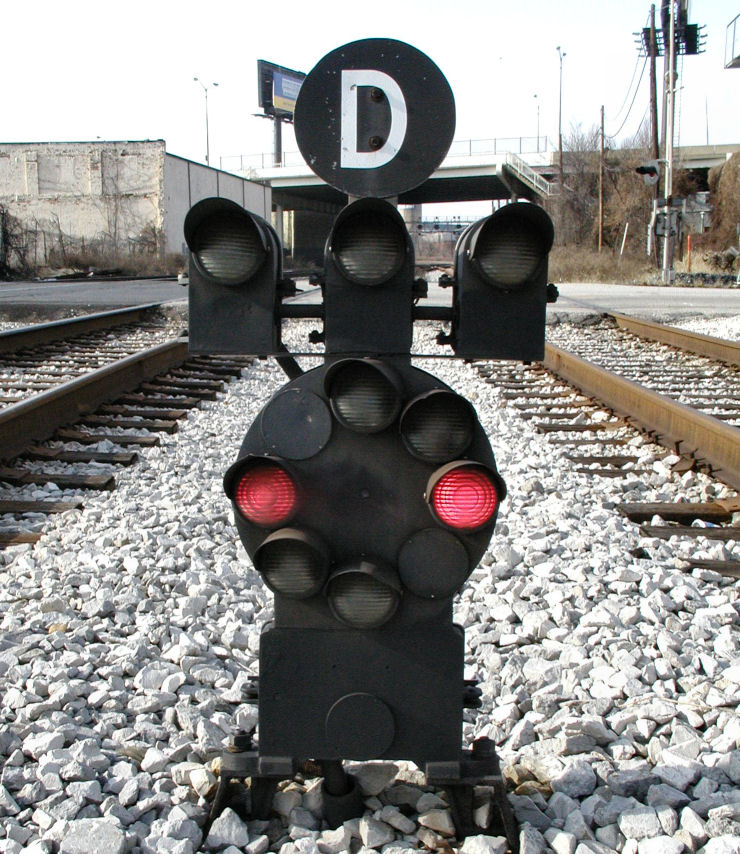
A dwarf CPL signal showing "stop". The three lamps above the main head allow "medium" and "slow" approach indications for the next signal.

A system combining aspects of the colour and position systems was developed on the Baltimore and Ohio Railroad (B&O) in 1920 and was patented by L.F. Loree and F.P. Patenall. It is similar to the position light system with the central light removed and the resulting pairs of lights colored in correspondence to the angle they make: green for the vertical pair, amber for the right diagonal pair, and red for the horizontal pair. An additional pair, colored "lunar white", may be added on the other diagonal for restricting indications. Speed signalling is indicated not by additional signal heads, but by a system of white or amber "orbital" lights placed in one of six positions above and below the main head. The position above or below indicates the current speed, while the left-to-right position indicates the speed at the next signal (full, medium, or slow in both cases). Dwarf signals have the same aspects as full-sized signals. One of the advantages claimed for the system is that burned-out bulbs produce aspects which can be interpreted unambiguously as either the intended indication (for the main head) or as a more restrictive indication (for the orbitals—if only the central head is lit, the indication is either slow or restricting).

Colour position lights (CPLs) were first installed as a pilot on the Staten Island Railway in New York City, at the time a B&O subsidiary; they were also applied to the Chicago and Alton Railroad when the latter was under B&O control, as well as on the B&O itself. With the disappearance of the B&O into CSX they have been gradually replaced with NORAC color light signals.

== Signal mounting ==
Lineside signals need to be mounted in proximity to the track which they control.

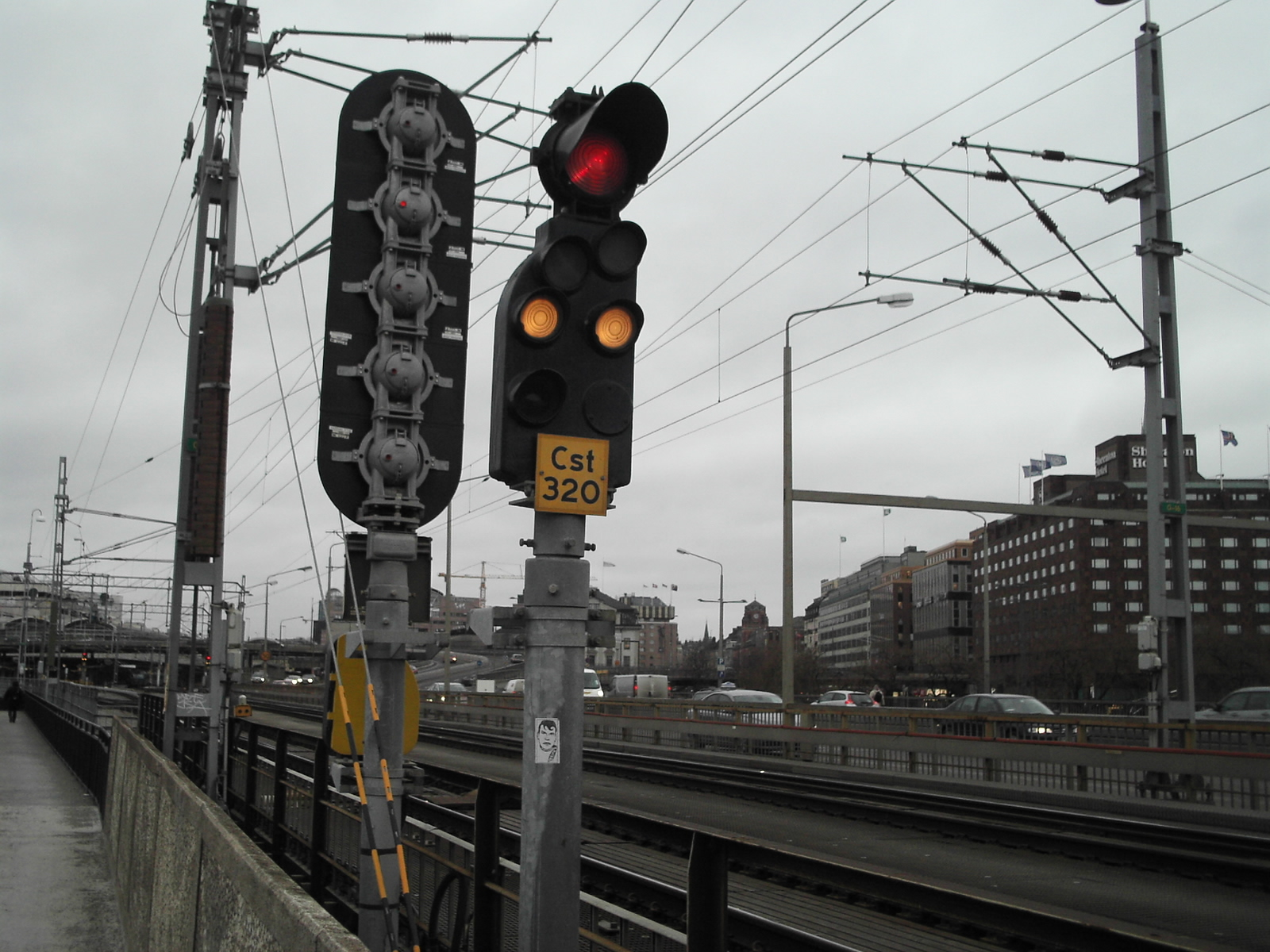
Swedish combined main and dwarf signal mounted on a post, displaying "Stop"

=== Post mounting ===
When a single track is involved, the signal is normally mounted on a post or mast which displays the arm or signal head at some height above the track, in order to allow it to be seen at a distance. The signal is normally placed on the engine driver's side of the track.

=== Gantry mounting ===
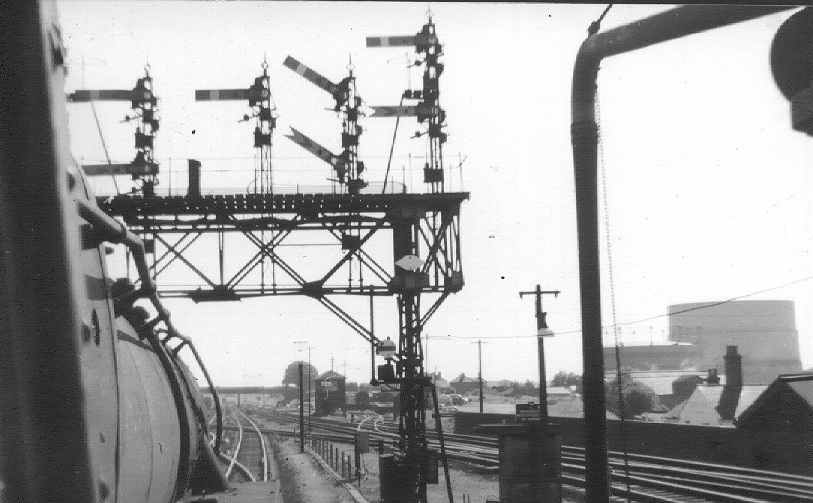
A gantry of British semaphore signals seen from the cab of a steam locomotive

When multiple tracks are involved, or where space does not permit post mounting, other forms are found. In double track territory one may find two signals mounted side by side on a bracket which itself is mounted on a post. The left hand signal then controls the left-hand track, and the right signal the right-hand track. A gantry or signal bridge may also be used. This consists of a platform extending over the tracks; the signals are mounted on this platform over the tracks they control.

=== Ground mounting ===
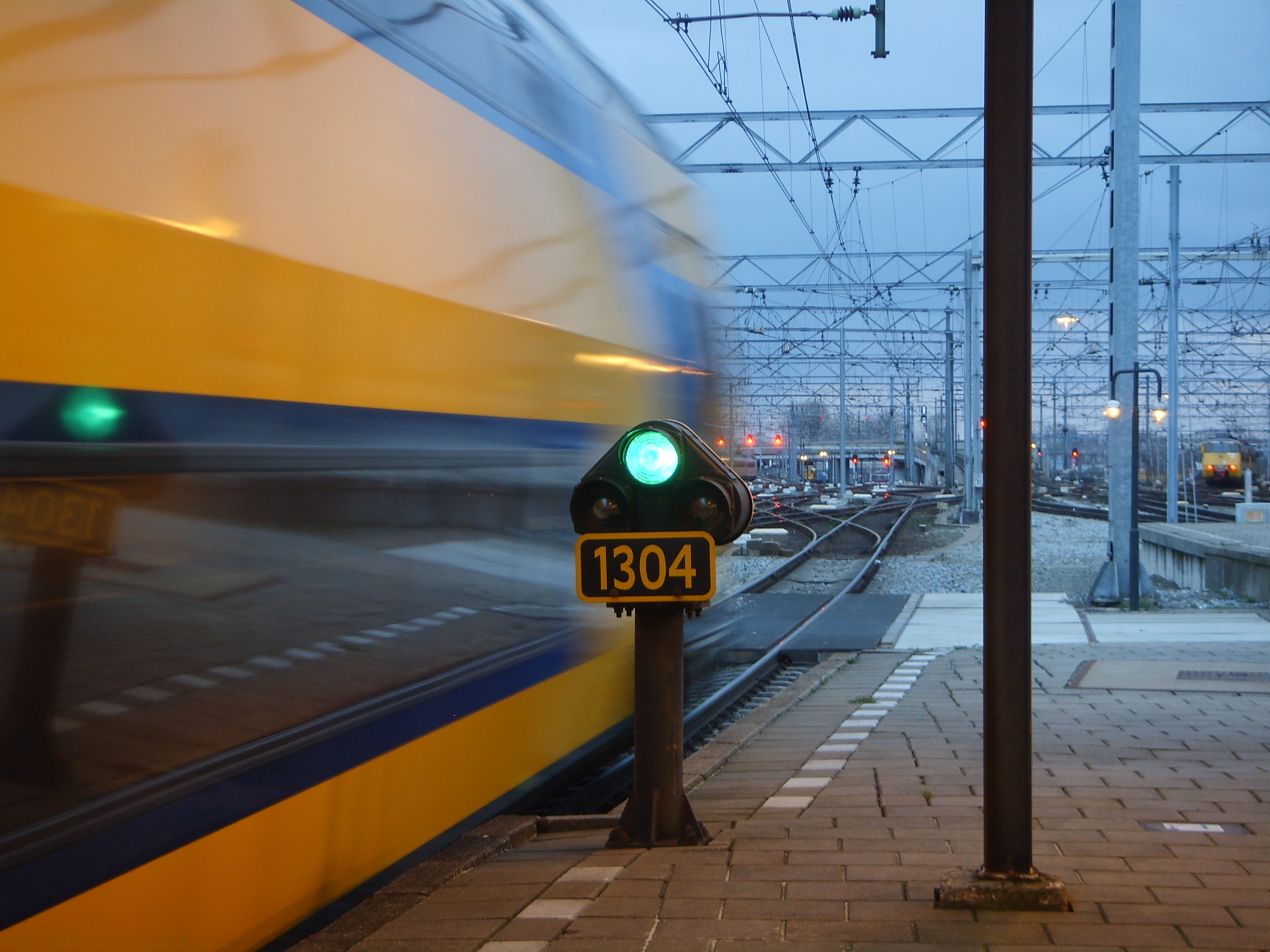
Dwarf signal at Utrecht Centraal, Netherlands

In some situations or places, such as in tunnels, where there is insufficient room for a post or gantry, signals may be mounted at ground level. Such signals may be physically smaller (termed dwarf signals). Rapid transit systems commonly use only dwarf signals due to restricted space. In many systems, dwarf signals are only used to display 'restrictive' aspects such as low speed or shunt aspects, and do not normally indicate 'running' aspects.

=== Other ===
Occasionally, a signal may be mounted to a structure such as a retaining wall, bridge abutment, or overhead electrification support.

=== Filaments ===
Electric lamps for railway signals are often fitted with twin filaments, so that if one burns out, the other keeps the signal lit. A more complicated version of this, such as in the SL35 lamp, a filament changeover relay is fitted in series with the first filament, where if the first filament burns out, the relay drops and lights the second filament. This filament fail relay also activates an alarm in the signal box.

=== Lamp proving ===
When lamps fail, this can result in aspects that are less restrictive (high speed) than when the lamps are correctly lit. This is potentially dangerous.

For example, in UK practice, if a white "feather" indicator fails, the low speed feather combined with a green light, which is low speed, becomes a green light on its own, which is high speed. A lamp proving relay would detect the reduction in current when more than two lamps are not working in a failed feather indicator, and prevent the green from showing. It can also display an indication on the signaller's panel.

Due to this possibility, most signals are configured to be failsafe.

For example, a flashing aspect can be used to display a less restrictive signal. In this case, if the relay that controls the flashing fails, the signal becomes more restricting. A flashing yellow, in Canada and the United States, is part of an advance clear to stop indication, which means the second signal ahead is stop. A solid yellow means clear to stop, which means the next signal ahead is stop.

== Control and operation of signals ==
Signals were originally controlled by levers situated at the signals, and later by levers grouped together and connected to the signal by wire cables, or pipes supported on rollers (US). Often these levers were placed in a special building, known as a signal box (UK) or interlocking tower (US), and eventually they were mechanically interlocked to prevent the display of a signal contrary to the alignment of the switch points. Automatic traffic control systems added track circuits to detect the presence of trains and alter signal aspects to reflect their presence or absence.

== Cab signalling ==
Some locomotives are equipped to display cab signals. These can display signal indications through patterns of lights in the locomotive cab, or in simple systems merely produce an audible sound to warn the driver of a restrictive aspect. Occasionally, cab signals are used by themselves, but more commonly they are used to supplement signals placed at lineside. Cab signalling is particularly useful on high speed railways. In the absence of lineside signals, fixed markers may be provided at those places where signals would otherwise exist, to mark the limit of a movement authority.

== Signalling power ==
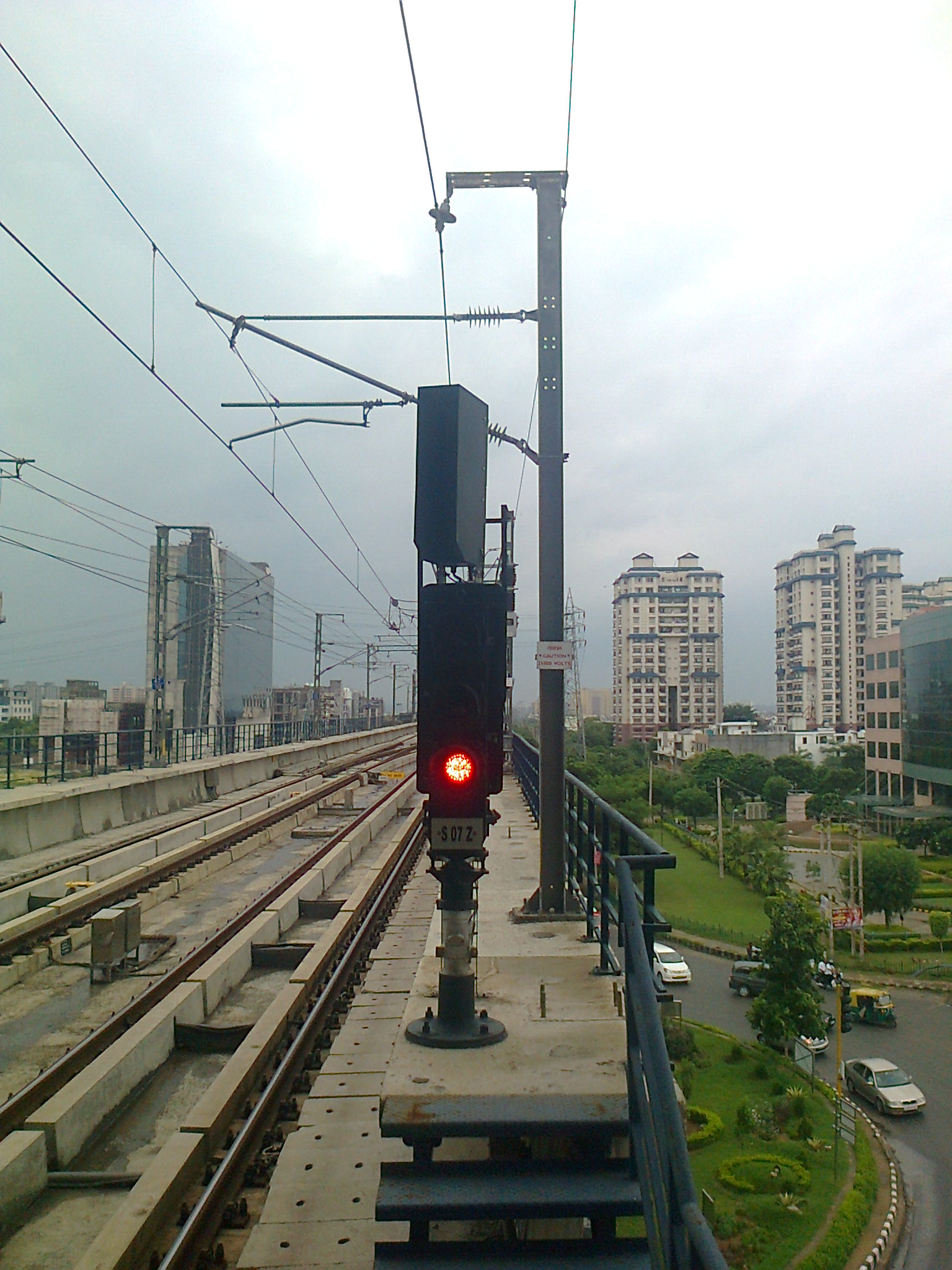
A signal used in the Delhi metro, typical of urban light rail signals

Usually, signals and other equipment (such as track circuits and level crossing equipment), are powered from a low voltage supply. The specific voltage varies with the country and equipment used. The reason behind this is that the low voltage allows easy operation from storage batteries and indeed, in some parts of the world (and previously in many more locations, before the widespread adoption of electricity), batteries are the primary power source, as mains power may be unavailable at that location. In urban built-up areas, the trend is now to power signal equipment directly from mains power, with batteries only as backup.

== See also ==
- Absolute block signalling – British railway signalling scheme
- Automatic block signaling – Railroad communications system
- Gantry
- Highball Signal – Historic railroad signal in Delmar, Delaware, US
- North American railroad signals
- Railway signalling – Principle of signals used to control railway traffic
- Train protection system – Railway fail-safe against human error
- Train speed optimization – A system that reduces the need for trains to brake and accelerate
