= Vestfyn Line =

Planned high-speed rail line on Funen, Denmark

Overview
- Status: Planned
- Locale: Funen, Denmark
- Termini: Odense; Middelfart

Service
- Type: High-speed rail

Technical
- Line length: 35 km (22 mi)
- Track gauge: 1,435 mm (4 ft 8 1/2 in) standard gauge

The Vestfyn Line is a planned high-speed rail line on the Danish island of Funen, to be built between Odense and Middelfart.

== Background ==
The Copenhagen–Ringsted Line, Denmark's first high-speed rail line, opened in 2019. As part of plans for high-speed rail in Denmark under the Hour Model, speed increases and sections of new line have been planned between the cities of Copenhagen, Odense, Aarhus, Esbjerg and Aalborg. In 2013, this was outlined further in the Togfond plan, which estimated the cost of a new Odense to Middelfart/Fredericia railway at DKK4.5 billion in 2017.

Approval for the construction of the line was given in November 2019, with construction to begin in 2023. The Vestfyn Line is proposed to shorten the route between Odense and Middelfart by 4 km and reduce journey times by 5 minutes.

== Route ==
The new high-speed is planned to roughly follow the boundary of the E20 Fynske Motorvej road. The line will free up capacity on the existing line; a commuter rail service on this line is planned similar to the S-train in Copenhagen.

In 2022, NIRAS estimated that the construction would be completed by 2028.

== See also ==
- High-speed rail in Denmark
