= Swedish railway signalling =

Swedish railway signalling system

The signalling system used on the standard-gauge railway network in Sweden is based on that of the traditional mechanical semaphore signals. Currently only colour-light signals are used, together with the Ansaldo L10000 Automatic Train Control system.

== Main signals ==
The main signals (huvudsignaler) display the following aspects:

Signal	Meaning	Comment
Stop	The signal must not be passed without permission from the traffic control. During shunting operations permission to pass a home signal displaying stop may be given with a radio or with a dwarf signal.	Permission to pass a red signal is given during signal system faults and must be documented by both driver and traffic control, and the max speed is then 40 km/h (25 mph).
Proceed 80	Authorises the driver to pass the signal at 80 km/h (50 mph) or at a higher speed given by the ATC system. Signs can give a lower or (if no ATC) higher speed.	The signal changes to red when the train passes the track circuit limit a few metres in front of the signal, so passengers might see the signal showing red.
Proceed 40, caution	Authorises the driver to pass the signal at 40 km/h (25 mph) or at a higher speed given by the ATC system. The next signal might be displaying stop if it is farther away than 450 metres (1,480 ft), so the driver must approach the next signal cautiously and be prepared to stop short of it.	
Proceed 80, expect stop	Authorises the driver to pass the signal at 80 km/h or at a higher speed given by the ATC system. The next signal is displaying stop, so the driver must decrease speed and approach the next signal prepared to stop short of it. Block signals on the Iron Ore Line between Peuravaara (near Kiruna) and the Norwegian border can show Proceed 80, expect stop with only one flashing green light (right image).	The next signal is between 800 and 3,000 metres (2,600 and 9,800 ft) away. If the distance to the next signal is more than 3,000 metres, a separate free-standing distant signal is used to govern the approach to that signal.
Proceed 80, expect proceed 80	Authorises the driver to pass the signal at 80 km/h or at a higher speed given by the ATC system. The next signal is displaying a proceed 80 aspect.	The next signal is between 800 and 3,000 metres (2,600 and 9,800 ft) away. If the distance to the next signal is more than 3,000 metres, a separate free-standing distant signal is used to govern the approach to that signal.
Proceed 80, expect proceed 40	Authorises the driver to pass the signal at 80 km/h or at a higher speed given by the ATC system. The next signal is displaying proceed 40, so the driver must decrease speed and approach the next signal prepared to pass it at a speed not exceeding 40 km/h (25 mph) or the speed shown on the ATC driver's display.	The next signal is between 800 and 3,000 metres (2,600 and 9,800 ft) away. If the distance to the next signal is more than 3,000 metres, a separate free-standing distant signal is used to govern the approach to that signal.
Proceed 40, short route	Authorises the driver to pass the signal at a maximum speed of 40 km/h (25 mph). The next signal is showing "stop" and is closer than 450 metres.	The next signal could also be a stop light at the end of the line, or an End Board (S-tavla).

The aspects may seem a little inverted, since a single green light means proceed 80, two green lights Proceed 40, caution and three green lights stands for Proceed 40, short route. In other words: more green means more cautiously. Some other countries e.g. Norway have opposite. If there is a sign saying lower speed limit than 80, of course that is valid. The speed limits apply to trains without Automatic Train Control (ATC) equipment. ATC signalling typically allow higher speeds, up to 200 km/h (120 mph). If there is no ATC, signs can show higher speed, but rarely above 110 km/h. If there is ATC there can be even higher signs which are valid only with ATC.

=== Two light signalling (Malmö and Stockholm city tunnels) ===
On some urban lines, such as the City Tunnel in Malmö and the Stockholm City Line, a simpler signal system is in use until ERTMS is fully implemented. The interpretation of the signals follow the ERTMS level 1 standard, but the actual look is national.
This system uses two light signals with blue number signs (instead of yellow/white in normal signalling) and can show the following aspects:

Signal	Meaning
Stop	The signal must not be passed without permission from the traffic control. During shunting operations permission to pass a home signal displaying stop may be given with a radio or with a dwarf signal.
Proceed 40 expect proceed 40	Authorises the driver to pass the signal at 40 km/h (25 mph) or at a higher speed given by the ATC or ERTMS system. The next signal is displaying a proceed 40 or proceed 40 caution aspect.
Proceed 40 caution	Authorises the driver to pass the signal at 40 km/h (25 mph) or at a higher speed given by the ATC or ERTMS system. The next signal is showing "stop" and is closer than 450 metres (1,480 ft).

These signals should not be confused with normal main signals with two lights, which have yellow number signs, while the "Two light signals" shown here have blue ones. The meaning is different to normal meanings of the signals, but if combined with a speed limit 40 (not valid for ATC) sign, the meanings are essentially the same.

=== Repeater signals ===
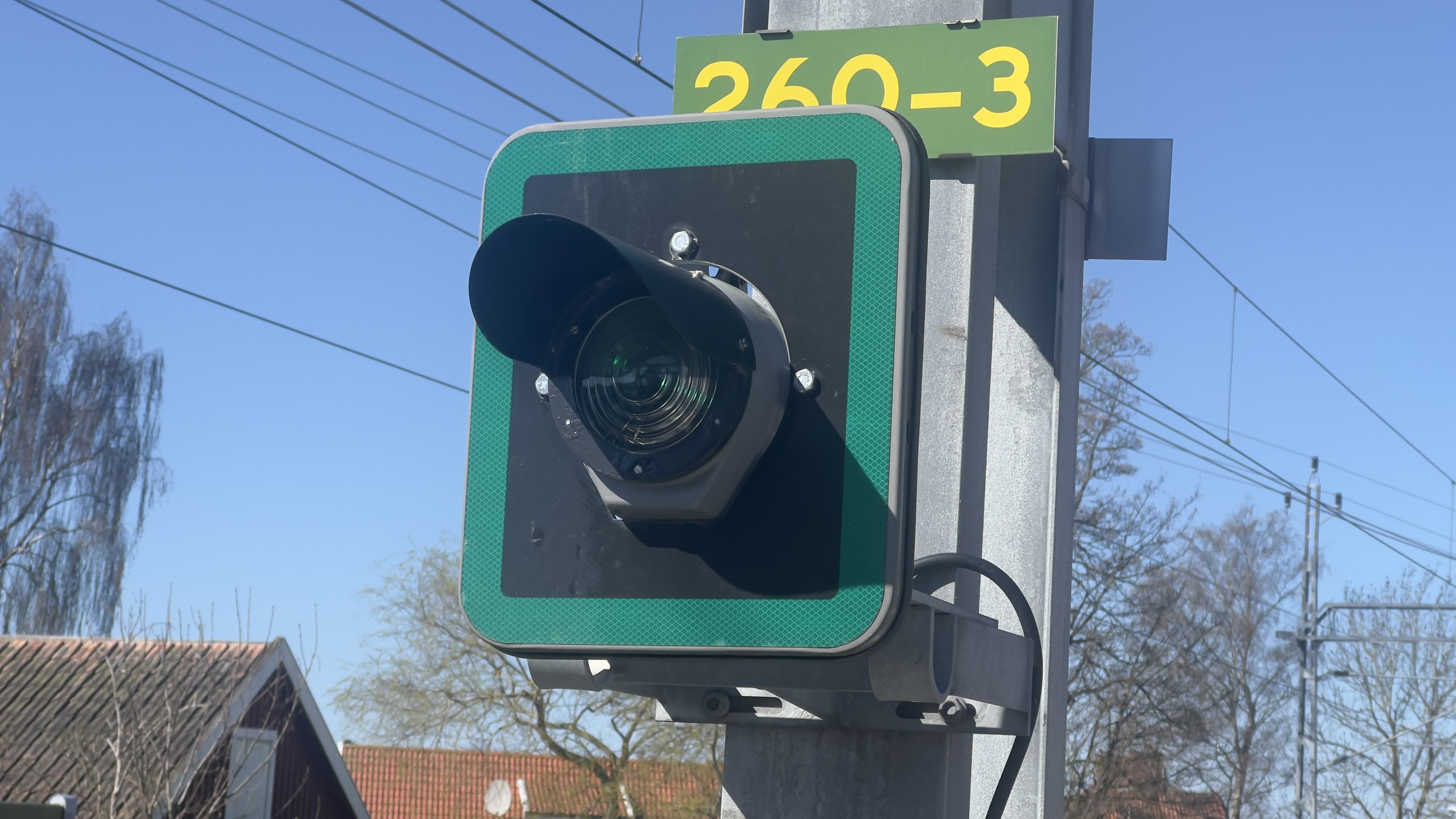
Picture of a repeater signal at Svalöv station in Skåne Län showing "Movement allowed"

Repeater signals are used to repeat a signal that is out of a stopped train driver's view. The repeater signals are used at places where blindspots can exist, such as stations or complex junctions. The repeated signal is a Main signal.

Signals	Meaning
Movement allowed	The next main signal is displaying "Proceed 80", "Proceed 40" or any other type of "Movement allowed"
Expect Stop	The next main signal is displaying "Stop" or "Signal failure"

=== Distant signals ===
Distant signals (försignaler) are informational signals used to give an advance warning about the next home signal. Distant signal are typically located 800 to 1,200 metres (2,600 to 3,900 ft) in advance of the home signal in question.
The aspects a free-standing distant signal can display are:

Signal	Meaning
Expect stop	The next signal is displaying stop, so the driver must decrease speed and approach the next signal prepared to stop short of it.
Expect; Proceed 80	The next signal is displaying Proceed 80.
Expect; Proceed 40	The next signal is displaying proceed 40, so the driver must decrease speed and approach the next signal prepared to pass it at a speed not exceeding 40 km/h (25 mph) or the speed shown on the ATC driver's display.

The signal indication is the same as for the combined aspects in the main signals.

== Dwarf signals ==
Dwarf signals (dvärgsignaler) are used as shunting signals and can show the following aspects:

Signal	Meaning
Stop	The signal must not be passed without permission from the traffic control.
Movement allowed	Shunting allowed. Points and derailers are in the right position. The track is free.
Movement allowed Track not clear	Shunting allowed Points and derailers are in the right position. The track is not free, or caution is needed.
Movement allowed Check points and clearance	Shunting allowed The driver must manually check the position of points and derailers, and the track clearance. Points and derailers are often manual or put in shunting mode.

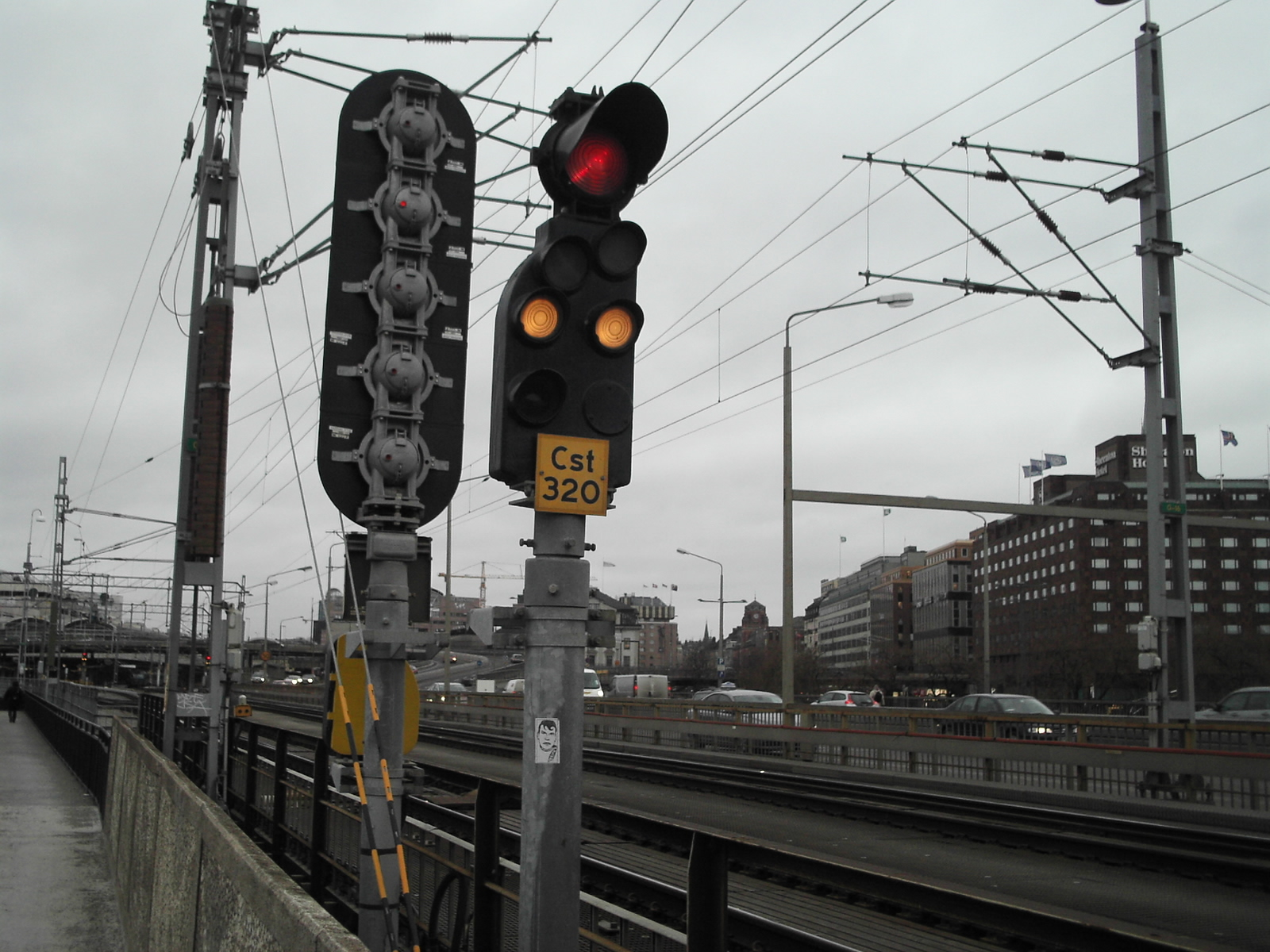
A huvuddvärgsignal at Stockholm Central Station displaying "stop"

There are also types of dwarf signals, called "Main Dwarf signals" (Huvuddvärgsignal) used as stand-ins for home signals in stations with lot of shunting or where there are a lot of switches that needs a signal. In addition to the dwarf signal aspects given above, these signals also have a red light and two green ones (one for "proceed 40", the other for "proceed 80").

== Road crossing signals ==
Road crossing signals (Vägkorsningssignaler (V-signaler)) are used at road crossings. They tell the driver if the crossing is clear (lights flashing, bells ringing or, if available, gates are closed) They can show the following aspects

Signal	Meaning
Stop before crossing (Crossing not clear)	The road crossing is not secured. The train must stop before the crossing if possible.
Pass (Crossing clear)	The road crossing is secured.

The same aspects are also used at moveable bridges, but with another sign under the signal.

=== Distant road crossing signal ===
Some road crossing signals have a distant signal (Vägkorsningsförsignal (V-försignal)), placed at a distance (usually not braking distance) from the road crossing signal.

Signal	Meaning
Expect Stop before crossing (Crossing not clear)	The road crossing is not secured. The train must stop before the crossing if possible.
Expect Pass (Crossing clear)	The road crossing is secured.

The distant road crossing signal is nicknamed "skull" (dödskalle).

== Fail safe ==
Because the aspects are in reverse with more green lights meaning slower, the aspects are not fail safe, so lamp proving is needed to prevent lamp failure giving a faster aspect.

Single and Double Green signals work the other way with Norwegian railway signalling and Danish railway signalling and it would be unsafe for drivers to cross the border, unless ATP were fitted. It is not permitted for Swedish drivers to drive into Norway and opposite where there is no ATC, unless extra education is taken (and before ATC was introduced everywhere in the other country except for a few kilometers from the border where crew change stations were located). This meant that freight trains Oslo–Narvik passed Hallsberg southeast of Oslo until the shortcut Kil–Ställdalen was upgraded to ATC in 2017.

== ERTMS ==
European Rail Traffic Management System (ERTMS/ETCS) has been introduced on a few railways in Sweden such as Botniabanan where it is actively being used. Mainly ERTMS level 2 is used, in which basically no light signals exist and all messages are shown on a display in the driver's compartment of the train.

Two railways, Citybanan and Citytunneln use signalling according to ERTMS level 1, although ATC is still used there, not ERTMS (for now).

== Rules on violation ==
An unauthorized stop signal passage (OSPA), i.e the passage of a signal or sign meaning stop (red main signal, horizontal dwarf signal, ERTMS arrow sign and more) without permission is considered a serious incident. They are divided into three categories, A where the signal showed stop even before the process, which may be due to the driver, failure of the train brakes, slipping and more, category B, where the signal was inadvertently set to stop due to technical error or mistake of the signalman, and category C, where the signal was intentionally stopped, for example due to a sudden danger such as a car at a level crossing. If it is suspected to be due to the driver, they may not drive any more until an investigation has been completed, and another driver may drive the train after an investigator has collected information about the train's route, usually causing a multiple hour delay. A driver who has caused several OSPAs may permanently lose their license.
