= Chincholi (disambiguation) =

Chincholi is a panchayat town and taluka in Kalaburagi district, Karnataka, India

Chincholi may also refer to:

- Chincholi Assembly constituency relating to Chincholi
- Chincholi Wildlife Sanctuary near Chincholi
- Chincholi, Ambegaon, a village in Pune district, Maharashtra
- Chincholi, Junnar, a village in Pune district, Maharashtra
- Chincholi Morachi, a village in Pune district, Maharashtra
- Chincholi, Parner, a village in Ahmednagar district, Maharashtra
