= Kalwadi =

Village in Maharashtra

Coordinates: 19°11′N 74°01′E

Kalwadi is a village in Junnar taluka, Pune district, of Maharashtra, India situated adjuscent to the Kukadi River and Yedgaon Dam.

The location code or village code of Kalwadi village is 555279. Kalwadi village is located in Junnar tehsil of Pune district in Maharashtra, India. It is situated 16 km away from sub-district headquarter Junnar and 80 km away from district headquarter Pune. Kalwadi village have the grampanchayat. The total geographical area of village is 444.38 hectares. Kalwadi has a total population of 1,683 peoples, male population is 824 while female population is 859. Literacy rate of kalwadi village is 80.27%, 87.50% males and 73.34% females are literate. There are 383 houses in Kalwadi village. Kalwadi belongs to Desh or Paschim Maharashtra region of Maharashtra state. It belongs to Pune Division . Pin code is 412412 and postal head office is Pimpalwandi (Pune). Mumbai is 170 km and Nashik is 120 km from this village. Umbraj No.1 ( 3 km ), Kandali ( 8 km ), Yedgaon ( 6 km ), Pimpalvandi ( 6 km ) are the nearby Villages to Kalwadi. Kalwadi is surrounded by Ambegaon Taluka towards west, Akole Taluka towards North, Khed Taluka towards South, Parner Taluka towards East . Junnar, Manchar, Sangamner, Shirur are the nearby Cities to Kalwadi.

Village Details
| Name | Kalwadi, काळवाडी |
| Taluka | Junnar |
| District | Pune |
| State | Maharashtra |
| Region | Desh or Paschim Maharashtra |
| Division | Pune |
| Languages | Marathi, Hindi, English |
| Time Zone | IST (UTC+5:30) |
| Elevation / Altitude | 619 meters above sea level |
| Total Area | 444.38 Hectors |
| Telephone Code / Std Code | 02132 |
| Assembly constituency | Junnar |
| Assembly MLA | Atul Vallabh Benake |
| Lok Sabha Constituency | Shirur |
| Member of Parliament | Dr.Amol Ramsing Kolhe |
| Sarpanch | Tushar Sharad Waman |
| Pincode | 412412 |

Religion

Hinduism is the major religion, practised by 98% of peoples of this village. 2% are other religions.

Education

Government (ZP School) Pre Primary school, Primary schools available in village. Nearest secondary school and junior college is at Pimpalwandi and name is Subhash Vidya Mandir. Another secondary school and junior college is at Umbraj 1, Nearest Arts, Commerce and Science Graduation Colleges are at Otur and Narayangaon and Junnar . Engineering Diploma, Degree, Pharmacy Diploma, Degree colleges are at Dumbarwadi, Ale, Belha, and Kuran.

Health

Government Primary health sub-centre available in village and is governed by the main centre Pimpalwandi

Agriculture

24 Hours agricultural power supply is available in this village. Whole area is irrigated from canals, Boreholes/Tube wells. Three Kolhapur Type bandhara's built on the natural odha. This help to hold the water resulting the increased in water level. Farmers of this village are well educated and doing the experiments in their fields to increase the yield, quality improvement, organic practices, value addition, marketing at APMC markets, open market, farmers to customer direct selling. Major crops are Banana, Sugarcane, Capsicum, Tomato, Onion, Cauliflower, Cabbage, Sweet Corn, Custard Apple, exotic vegetables, all type of leafy vegetables, Wheet, Bajara, Soybean. One group of farmers runs the Banana Ripening Chamber for the value addition. Farmers started to use organic fertilizers and pesticides produced in their own 10 drum therapy plant as an organic practices and to produce chemical residue free agro produce. Deccan Valley Farmers Producer Company Limited is a farmers producer company formed by the group of the farmers of this village and taken the initiatives like group farming, value addition, marketing of agro produce, trainings to farmers. more than 250 farmers connected with this company.

Drinking Water and Sanitation

For drinking water, Water Filtration Plant is installed by the grampanchayat Kalwadi and filtered water is available at all the time in day and night round the year. All the villagers are allowed to take water from this plant with very less charges. Untreated tap water supply available all round the year for the other usage. Completely covered or underground drainage system available in this Village.

Transportation

Public Bus service i.e. State transport bus available in this village and runs between Narayangaon and Otur via Umbraj. Nearest national highway Pune Nashik is less than 7 km. State highway and district road passes through this village.

Temples

There is many temples in village and gram daivat is Kalikamata. The temple of Kalikamata is at the entrance of village. This temple is very old and build by the villagers with donation and work contribution. Kalikamata festival is the major festival in village and it is celebrated for five days starting on Chaitra amavasya every year. Lots of pilgrims, devotees from all over the India coming to celebrate this festival. Every year more that 5 lacs pilgrims and devotees vising to this temple. Another temples are Om Chaitanya Kanifnath Maharaj temple, Om Munjeshwar temple, Malganga temple, Bhatujibaba temple, Santoshi mata temple, Hanuman temple.

Tourism

Agro tourism started in this village in recent years. Visitors attraction is mainly rural life like sunrise, visits to cow farms and try milking cows and drink farm fresh milk, farms visits and understand the farm practices, Yedgaon Dam visit and enjoy the swimming and observe the beauty of surrounding villages from the height of dam wall, visits to temples, amla processing plant, banana chips plant, enjoy the home made food. Speciality of this village is Maswadi मासवडी, Puran Poli, Amti Bhakari. Other nearby best visiting places are Shivneri fort, Lenyadri Ganesha Temple, Ojhar Vighnahar Temple, Vighnahar Sugar Factory, Chawand fort, Harischhandra fort, Malshej ghat, Pimpalgaon Joga Dam, Vadaj Dam, Manikdoh Dam, Naneghat, world famous biggest Asian telescope GMRT i.e. Giant Meterwave Radio Telescope, pot holes in Kukadi river are the major attractions.
