= Maharashtra Rail Infrastructure Development Corporation =

Maharashtra government and Ministry of Railways joint venture for railway development

- Maharashtra Rail Infrastructure Development Corporation
- Type: Public Sector Undertaking
- Headquarters: Mumbai
- Managing Director: Shri Rajesh Kumar Jaiswal
- Website: https://www.maharail.com/

Maharashtra Rail Infrastructure Development Corporation (MRIDC or MahaRail) is a Public Sector Undertaking (PSU) of Government of Maharashtra(GOM) and Ministry of Railways (MOR). The authorized share capital of MRIDC is Rs 100 Cr. with contribution of Rs. 50 Cr by Govt. of Maharashtra and Rs. 50 Cr. by Ministry of Railways. It is headquartered at Nariman Point, Mumbai and have offices across Maharashtra in Nagpur, Pune, and Nashik. The corporation is involved in implementation of various Railway projects such as construction of ROB in lieu of level crossings, construction of new Railway Line and expansion of existing Railway Lines in the territory of Maharashtra. It started functioning from July 2018.

== Projects ==
=== Road Over Bridges/ Road Under Bridges/ Limited Height Subways ===
The corporation is constructing various Road Over Bridges, Road Under Bridges and Limited Height Subways at various locations over the Railway lines of 4 Railway zones viz. Central Railway, Western Railway, South Central Railway and South East Central Railway across Maharashtra. Also, MRIDC has signed an MOU with MCGM and MMRDA for construction of Road Over Bridges and Road Under Bridges in Mumbai and Suburban areas.

=== Railway Line projects ===
- Pune - Nashik Semi High Speed Railway line.
- Gauge Conversion (Narrow Gauge to Broad Gauge) between Nagpur (Itwari) – Nagbhid Railway Stations .
- Igatpuri - Manmad (3rd & 4th Railway line)
- Salwa – Butibori (Chord Line).
