= Chandoli Budruk =

Village in Maharashtra, India

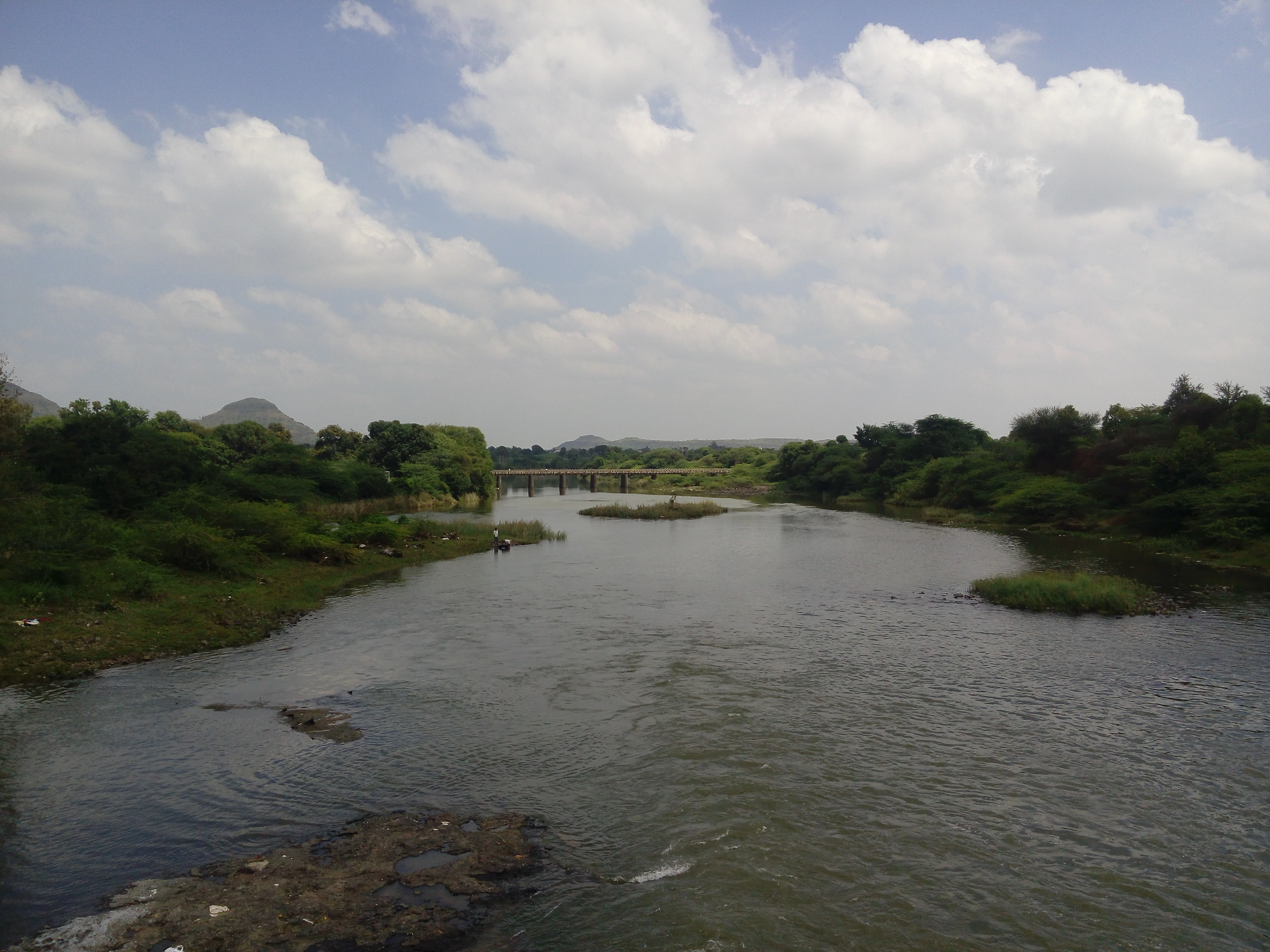
Ghod River, September 2015

Chandoli Budruk is a village in Ambegaon Taluka of Pune district in the Indian state of Maharashtra. According to 2011 Census the population of Chandoli Budruk is 3,546 out of which 1,777 are male and 1,769 are females. There are total 692 houses in Chandoli Budruk. The GP Code of Chandoli Budruk is 185274 and PIN Code is 410 503.

== Geography ==
The distance between Manchar to Chandoli Budruk is 5 km. It is situated at latitude 18.98775 and longitude 73.9241. Chandoli Budruk is situated on the banks of 'Ghod River'. It is a tributary of the Bhima River.

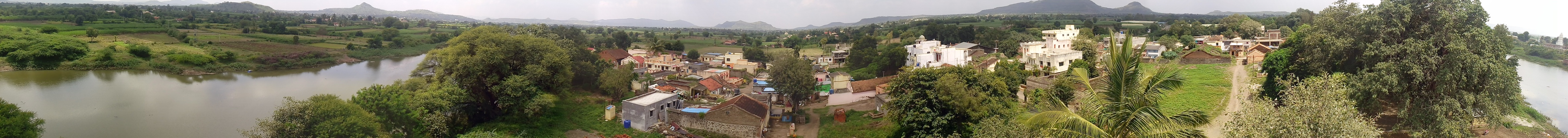
Chandoli Budruk Panorama From Mahadev Temple Tank, September 2015

== History ==
It is believed that Navnath used to stay a night in Chandoli Budruk when travelling to Bhimashankar. Now, on that place there is a temple in the memory of Navnath Known as 'Shree Kanhoba Temple'. There is a site of Chalcolithic culture on river banks which is 3500–3000 years B.P. Excavation of the Chalcolithic site in 1960 and 1961 by Dr. S. B. Deo and G. G. Majumdar of the Deccan College and Post-Graduate Research Institute revealed a single-culture site, with habitational deposits 4–5 feet thick.

The excavation team found hydraulic lime flooring with circular postholes, clay hearths a half-meter wide, and constructions containing white ash, charcoal, lime and burnt clay. Assorted pottery was also found at the site, decorated mostly with geometric designs, though motifs such as leaves, mountains and antelopes were present. Copper objects found at the site include two chisels, leg ornaments, and a dagger with a leaf-shaped mid-ribbed blade – the first of its kind found in a stratified context in India.

== Burials ==
Twenty-four urn burials were found at the site, twenty-two of them children. One of the adult burials consisted of three jars in a north–south alignment, with the skeleton mostly outside the jars. The skeleton had burn marks on the face and skull, and both adult skeletons were missing anklebones. The urn burials resemble those found at an archaeological site in Nevasa.
