= Pune District Education Association =

- पुणे जिल्हा शिक्षण मंडळ
- Formation: 7 September 1941 (84 years ago)
- Founder: Baburaoji Gholap
- Founded at: Pune, Maharashtra, India
- Type: Education organization
- Headquarters: Pune, Maharashtra, India
- Key people: Ajit Pawar (chairman and president)
- Main organ: Maharashtra government
- Affiliations: Maharashtra State Board of Secondary and Higher Secondary Education; Savitribai Phule Pune University
- Website: pdeapune.org

The Pune District Education Association is an Indian educational organization, based in Pune, Maharashtra.

It is the administrative authority for a large number of schools and colleges.

== Foundation ==
The association is one of the largest institution providing education at school and college level in the Pune district. It was founded on 7 September 1941 by educationalist Reverend Baburaoji Gholap, Annasaheb Aawate and their colleagues.

== Mission ==
The association's mission is to provide highly recognized knowledge centers of learning resources for primary to post-graduation education. The association sticks to their purpose and firm belief in up-lifting literacy in socio-economically weaker sections of the society.

== Accreditation ==
All the association's schools are affiliated to the Maharashtra State Board of Secondary and Higher Secondary Education, the Maharashtra State Board of Technical Education; and the colleges to Pune University.

== See also ==
- List of educational institutions in Pune
