= Honya Kengle =

Koli freedom fighter

Bandkari Naik Honyaji Bhagoji Kengle Chief of Kengle kolis
- नायक होन्याजी भागोजी केंगले
- Born: Honyaji Bhagoji Kengle; 1836; Jambhori village, Pune, Pune district, British Indian Empire
- Died: 1876 (aged 39–40); Ahmednagar central jail, Ahmednagar district, British Indian Empire
- Cause of death: Hanged
- Other names: Honya Naik; Honya Koli; Honya Kengale
- Occupation: Agriculturist
- Years active: 1872 - 1876
- Era: British era
- Movement: Indian independence movement
- Criminal charges: Murder, Plundering
- Criminal penalty: Hanged to Death
- Father: Naik Bhagoji Kengle

The Honyaji Bhagoji Kengle (also spelled as Honya Kengla, Honya Naik, Honya Kenglia, Honya Koli) was Koli freedom activist from Maharashtra who sought freedom from British colonial rule in India. Kengle also fought against Sahukars, or Moneylenders who were capturing the lands of poor native Indians and British supporting elements. The Bombay government announced the reward of INR 1000 for Honya Kengle dead or alive and 200 - 600 INR for other revolutionaries. He was labelled as an Outlaw by British government. He led the Koli rebellion from 1872 to 1876.

Honya Kengla was considered as Robin Hood of Bombay and a Hero of his region. He was fully support by Tribal communities of West Ghats.

== Early life ==
The Honya Kengle was born in 1836 in a Koli family of Jambhori village in Pune district to Naik Bhagoji Kengle who was chief of Mahadev Kolis of Kengle clan.

== Revolutionary activities ==
In 1872, the Honya Kengle took up arms against British rule in Maharashtra mostly in North West Poona. He collected a revolutionary army of Kolis in Deccan and attacked and plundered the British controlled territory in Pune, Nashik, Thana and Ahmednagar. He cut off the Nose of Marwadi Baniyas because they were in full support of British officials.

In 1874, a special British force under Colonel Scott and Mr. W. F. Sinclair C. S. was despatched to burn down the rebellion. The Koli rebellion under the leadership of Honya Koli was principally directed against the moneylenders. The disturbances merged into the more widespread Deccan riots of 1875.

== Death ==
In 1876, During the fight between British troops and Honiya Kengle's revolutionary Koli army, they were defeated by troops and Kengle was captured by Major H. Daniel but Kengle had become a hero throughout the region. When he was tried in Pune, the jury returned a verdict of not guilty, despite the incriminating evidence against him. The British judge promptly ordered that Honiya be re tried in Bombay city. The case was heard there two months later, and Honiya was hanged in Ahmednagar central jail.

== See also ==
- Vasudev Balwant Phadke
