= Government Polytechnic, Awasari Kh =

Coordinates: 19.9526°N 73.8624°E

- Other names: GP Awasari
- Motto: तेजस्वि नावधीतमस्तु
- Type: Government institute
- Established: 2008
- Affiliations: Maharashtra State Board of Technical Education
- Principal: Dr. D.R. Nandanwar
- Location: Awasari Kh, Tal. Ambegaon, Pune, Maharastra, 412405, India
- Campus: Rural, 17 acres
- Website: www.gpawasari.ac.in

The Government Polytechnic, Awasari Kh is a public polytechnic college in Awasari Kh, Pune, Maharashtra. It is an institution run by the Government of Maharashtra and offers diploma programs in engineering & technology. The college is accredited by the All India Council for Technical Education (AICTE) and affiliated with the Maharashtra State Board of Technical Education (MSBTE).

== Programs Offered ==
Full Time Diploma Program (3-year):

Sr.No.	Name of Programme	Duration	Intake Capacity
1	Civil Engineering	3 Year	60
2	Mechanical Engineering	3 Year	60
3	Electrical Engineering	3 Year	60
4	Computer Engineering	3 Year	60
5	Information Technology	3 Year	60
6	Electronics & Telecommunication	3 Year	60
7	Automobile Engineering	3 Year	60
Total Intake - 420

== Campus ==
The total annual intake capacity of all these programmes is 420 students. The premises of this institute is spread over 17 acres of land. Accommodation for 336 boys, and 288 girls is also available, which is shared with Government College of Engineering and Research, Avasari Khurd.
