= Loni, Ambegaon =

Village in Maharashtra

Loni
- Village
- Location within Maharashtra Location within India
- Coordinates: 18.893°N 74.082°E
- Country: India
- State: Maharashtra
- District: Pune
- Tehsil: Ambegaon

Government
  - Type: Panchayati raj (India)
  - Body: Gram panchayat

Population (2011)
  - Total: 2,599

Languages
  - Official: Marathi
  - Other spoken: Hindi
- Time zone: UTC+5:30 (IST)
- Telephone code: 02114
- ISO 3166 code: IN-MH
- Vehicle registration: MH-14
- Website: pune.nic.in

Loni is a village in Ambegaon taluka of Pune District in the state of Maharashtra, India.The village is administrated by a Sarpanch who is an elected representative of village as per constitution of India and Panchayati raj (India). According to the 2011 census, the village has a population of 2,599 people.
