= 2014 Malin landslide =

Natural disaster in Pune, Maharashtra, India

- Location within Maharashtra
- Date: 30 July 2014
- Location: Malin, Ambegaon taluka, Pune District, Maharashtra, India; 19°9′40″N 73°41′18″E
- Cause: Landslide due to heavy rain
- Deaths: 151

Location of Malin in Maharashtra state.

On 30 July 2014, a landslide occurred in the village of Malin in the Ambegaon taluka of the Pune district in Maharashtra, India. The landslide, which hit early in the morning while residents were asleep, was believed to have been caused by a burst of heavy rainfall, and killed at least 151 people. Rains continued after the landslide making rescue efforts difficult.

== Cause ==
The landslides were caused after heavy rainfall that had begun the previous day, then with the village receiving 108 mm (4 in) of rain on 29 July and continuing throughout the following day. The environmental destruction that resulted in the landslide is believed to have had many causes. The major cause was the negligence of geological facts before any developmental process. Another cause cited as contributing to the landslide was deforestation in the area. Deforestation removes not only trees but also root structures that hold together the soil. Through deforestation, the soil of the surrounding land was made loose, and experts argue that deforestation was the primary undelaying anthropogenic cause of the landslide. One additional reason was changing agricultural practices – villagers had recently shifted from cultivation of rice and finger millet to wheat, which required leveling of steep areas, which contributed to the instability of the hills. Also, the construction of the nearby Dimbhe Dam ten years ago was considered as a possible reason. The instability of the hillsides was due to the construction activities, which are often done without careful analysis of environmental consequences. Stone quarrying, among other types of construction, was specifically blamed by Sumaira Abdulali of the Awaaz Foundation, for the instability of the hillside.

== Casualties ==
Although initial reports stated that the landslide had killed 17 people, officials expected the death toll to exceed 150. As of 4 August 2014, the death toll had reached 134. The bodies so far recovered were of 50 men, 64 women and 20 children. About 44 to 46 separate houses were believed to have been buried in the landslide.

== Management ==
The landslide was first noticed by a bus driver who drove by the area and saw that the village had been overrun with mud and earth. Emergency services, including 378 personnel of the National Disaster Response Force, were mobilized to the area, and 8 victims had been rescued from the landslide prior to the evening of 30 July. Nevertheless, rescue efforts had been hampered by poor road conditions and continuing rains. Authorities have also expressed pessimism about the possibility of recovering any of the trapped people alive. As of 31 July, 22 people had been rescued alive from the landslide. On 4 August, the survivors of the landslide were ordered by the district administration to move out of Malin. Apart from the Security Forces, members of voluntary organizations and locals also helped in rescue operations. On 7 August, rescue operations officially drew to a close, with the final death toll resting at 151.

== Reactions of malin ==
- Office of Prime Minister of India released a statement in response to the landslide, in which they "condoled the loss of lives in the landslide and directed all possible efforts to help the affected people."
- Chief of the Nationalist Congress Party, Sharad Pawar, dubbed the landslide "unfortunate", and tweeted that "We have many villages located beneath hillocks. This incident has alarmed us to rethink about such villages."
- The CPIM demanded a "time bound enquiry into the true causes of this disaster".
