= Amade, Ambegaon =

Village in Maharashtra

Amade
- Village
- Location in Maharashtra, India Amade (India)
- Coordinates: 19.1549509°N 73.66347°E
- Country: India
- State: Maharashtra
- District: Pune
- Tehsil: Ambegaon

Government
  - Type: Panchayati raj (India)
  - Body: Gram panchayat

Population (2011)
  - Total: 242

Languages
  - Official: Marathi
  - Other spoken: Hindi
- Time zone: UTC+5:30 (IST)
- Telephone code: 02114
- ISO 3166 code: IN-MH
- Vehicle registration: MH-14
- Website: pune.nic.in

Amade is a village in Ambegaon taluka of Pune District in the state of Maharashtra, India.The village is administered by a sarpanch who is an elected representative of village as per the constitution of India and Panchayati raj (India).
