= Chikhali, Pune =

Village in Maharashtra, India

Chikhali
- Village
- Location in Maharashtra, India Chikhali (India)
- Country: India
- State: Maharashtra
- District: Pune
- Tehsil: Ambegaon

Government
  - Type: PCMC(India)
  - Body: Gram panchayat

Languages
  - Official: Marathi
  - Other spoken: Hindi
- Time zone: UTC+5:30 (IST)
- Telephone code: 02114
- ISO 3166 code: IN-MH
- Vehicle registration: MH-14
- Website: pune.nic.in

Chikhali is a village in Haveli taluka of Pune District in the state of Maharashtra, India. The village is administered by a Nagarsevak who is an elected representative of the ward as per constitution of India and Corporation (India).

== links ==
- Villages in pune maharashtra
