= Ahupe =

Village in Maharashtra, India

Coordinates: 19°11′N 73°34′E

- Village
- Location in Maharashtra, India Ahupe (India)
- Country: India
- State: Maharashtra
- District: Pune
- Tehsil: Ambegaon

Government
  - Type: Panchayati raj (India)
  - Body: Gram panchayat

Population (2011)
  - Total: 1,107

Languages
  - Official: Marathi
  - Other spoken: Hindi
- Time zone: UTC+5:30 (IST)
- Telephone code: 02114
- ISO 3166 code: IN-MH
- Vehicle registration: MH-14
- Website: pune.nic.in

Ahupe is a village in Ambegaon taluka of Pune District in the state of Maharashtra, India. The village is administrated by a Sarpanch who is an elected representative of village as per constitution of India and Panchayati raj (India).

== References contact ==
Nakul shinde 7666516752/9767629004

https://Sahyadries.in book from this link

Just in 700 Rs
