= Junnar taluka =

Junnar taluka Junnar
- Tehsil
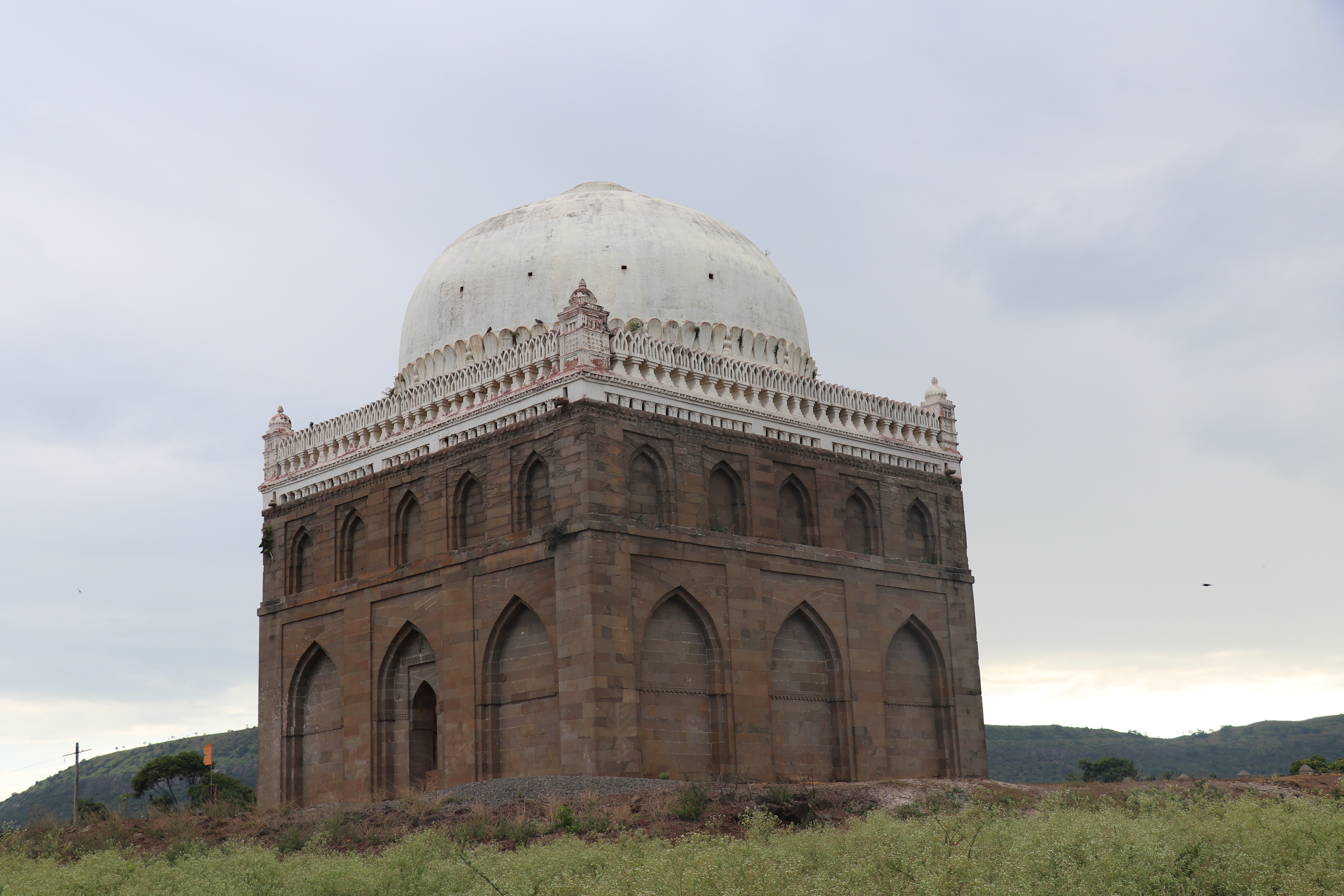
- Habshi Gumbaz

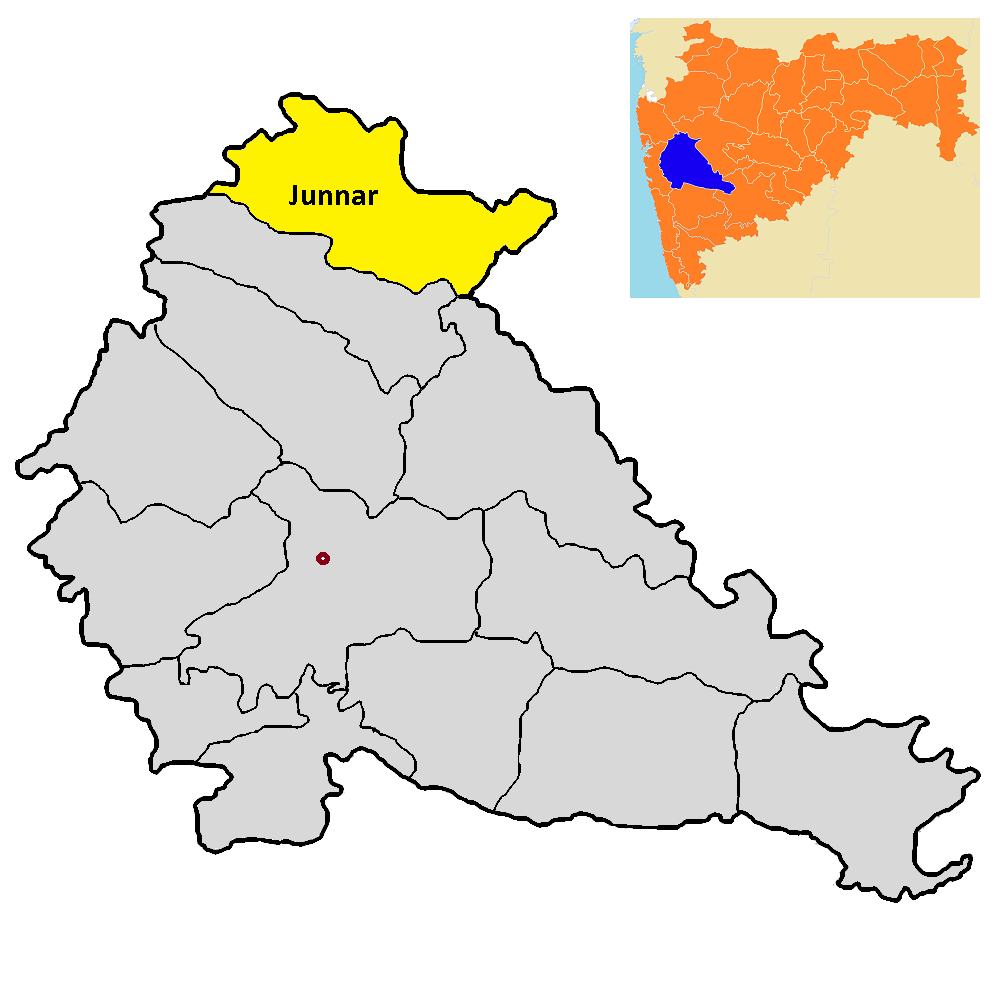
- Location of Junnar in Pune district in Maharashtra
- Country: India
- State: Maharashtra
- District: Pune district
- Headquarters: Junnar
- Major villages: See text

Government
  - Lok Sabha constituency: Shirur
  - Assembly constituency: Junnar
  - MLA: ATUL VALLABH BENKE

Population (2011)
  - Tehsil: 399,302
  - Urban: 6.34%

Demographics
  - Literacy rate: 67%
  - Sex ratio: 1000:840
- Rain: Average of 200 mm to 550 mm
- Website: Junnar Tourism

Junnar taluka is a taluka of the Pune district in the Indian state of Maharashtra. It is northernmost taluka of the District. The area is well known for two of the Ashtavinayak temples at Lenyadri and Ozar respectively. The taluka is also the home of Shivneri Fort, GMRT (Khodad), and Vikram Sarabhai Earth Station at Arvi. There is also a tomb (Samadhi) at Ale of the buffalo that recited Vedas when requested by the 12th century Sant Dnyaneshwar. The five main dams are named Yedgaon, Pimapalgaon Joga, ManikDoha, Chilhewadi and Wadaj. An ancient place called Naneghat is there. It is known for historical evidence that was written in Bramhi Lipi, on the walls of the caves. Darya Ghat is 21 km from Junnar Which is famous for waterfalls. Kukdeshwar an ancient temple of lord Shiva is in Junnar.

== Demographics ==
Religions in Junnar taluk (2011)
Religion	Percent
Hinduism	91.16%
Islam	6.19%
Buddhism	1.81%
Jainism	0.55%
Other or not stated	0.29%

Junnar taluka has a population of 399,302 according to the 2011 census. Junnar had a literacy rate of 83.80% and a sex ratio of 973 females per 1000 males. 42,941 (10.75%) are under 7 years of age. 25,315 (6.34%) lived in urban areas. Scheduled Castes and Scheduled Tribes make up 4.49% and 20.27% of the population respectively.

Languages of Junnar taluk (2011)
1. Marathi (90.2%)
2. Hindi (4.22%)
3. Urdu (2.49%)
4. Telugu (0.96%)
5. Others (2.15%)

At the time of the 2011 Census of India, 90.18% of the population in the district spoke Marathi, 4.22% Hindi, 2.49% Urdu and 0.96% Telugu as their first language.

== Villages ==
- Agar
- Ahinavewadi
- Ajanawale
- Ale
- Aldare
- Alme
- Ambe
- Ambegavan
- Amboli
- Ane
- Aptale
- Arvi
- Aurangpur
- Ballalwadi
- Bangarwadi
- Barav
- Basti
- Belhe
- Belsar
- Bhivade Bk.
- Bhivade Kh
- Bhorwadi
- Bori Kh
- Bori Bk
- Botarde
- Buchakewadi
- Chawand
- Chilhewadi
- Chincholi Kashid
- Datkhilwadi
- Devale
- Dhalewadi Tarf Haveli
- Dhalewadi Traf Minher
- Dhamankhel
- Dhangarwadi
- Dholwad
- Dingore
- Dumbarwadi
- Ghangaldare
- Ghatgnar
- Godre
- Golegaon
- Gulanchwadi
- Gunjalwadi
- Gunjalwadi Belhe
- Hadsar
- Hatvij
- Hhinde
- Hivare Bk
- Hivare Khurd
- Hivare Tarfe Minher
- Hivare Tarfe Narayangaon
- Inglun
- Jadhavwadi
- Jalwandi
- Kaldare
- Kale
- KaranJale
- Kalwadi
- Kandli
- Katede
- Kewadi
- Khamagaon
- Khamundi
- Khanapur
- Khangaon
- Khatkale
- Khilarwadi
- Khodad
- khubi
- Kolwadi
- Kopare
- Kumshet
- Kuran
- Kusur
- Madh
- Mandarne
- Mandave
- Mangrul
- Manikdoh
- Manjarwadi
- Nalawane
- Narayangaon
- Netwad
- Nimagaon T Mahalunge
- Nimdari
- Nimgaon sava
- Nimgire
- Nirgude
- Otur
- Ozar No.1
- Ozar No.2
- Padali
- Pangari Traf Madh
- Pargaon Tarf Ale
- Pargaon Traf Madh
- Parunde
- Pemdara
- Pimpalgaon Traf Narayangaon
- Pimpalgaon Joga
- Pimpalwandi
- Pimplgaon Shiddhanath
- Pimpri Kawala
- Pimpri Pendhar
- Pur
- Rajur
- Rajuri
- Ralegan
- Ranmala
- Rohkadi
- Sakori Tarf Belhe
- Sanganore
- Santwadi
- Sawargaon
- Shinde
- Shindewadi
- Shiroli Kh
- Shiroli Bk
- Shiroli Tarf Ale
- Sitewadi
- Somatwadi
- Sonawale
- Sukalwedhe
- Sultanpur
- Surale
- Taleran
- Tambe
- Tambewadi
- Tejewadi
- Tejur
- Tikekarwadi
- Uchhil
- Udapur
- Umbraj No 1
- Umbraj No 2
- Unchkhadak
- Undekhadak
- Vadaj
- Vadgaon Kandali
- Vadgaon Sahani
- Vithalawadi
- Wadgaon Anand
- Wanewadi
- Warulwadi
- Yadgaon
- Yenere

== See also ==
- Talukas in Pune district
- Junnar Tourism Official Website Nisargramya Junnar Website
- Rupali Repale
