= Otur, Maharashtra =

Village in Maharashtra

Otur is a village with a population of about 98258 thousand, is the Junnar sub district's 2nd most populous village. Located in the Junnar sub district of the Pune district in the state Maharashtra in India, the total geographical area of Otur is 38 km and it is the 2nd biggest village by area in the sub district. Population density of the village is 538 persons per km.

The nearest city to Otur is Junnar city and the distance from Otur to Junnar city is 20 km. The village has its own post office and the pin code of Otur village is 412409. The headquarters of Otur's parent district, Pune, is 85 km away. 10 square kilometers (27%) of the village's total area is covered by forest.

== Demographics ==
The village is home to about 20 thousand people, among them about 10 thousand (51%) are male and 9973 (49%) are female. 80% of the whole population are from general caste, 4% are from schedule caste and 16% are schedule tribes. The child (aged under 6 years) population of Otur village is 10%, among which 54% are boys and 46% are girls. There are 4311 households in the village and an average of 5 people live in every family.

== Literacy ==
In total about 16 thousand people in the village are literate, among them 8493 are male and 9900 are female. Literacy rate (children under 6 are excluded) of Otur is 86%. 92% of male and 80% of female population are literate here.
