= Awasari Khurd =

Village in Maharashtra

- Village
- Location in Maharashtra, India Awasari Khurd (India)
- Coordinates: 18.9731691°N 73.9600605°E
- Country: India
- State: Maharashtra
- District: Pune
- Tehsil: Ambegaon

Government
  - Type: Panchayati raj (India)
  - Body: Gram panchayat

Languages
  - Official: Marathi
  - Other spoken: Hindi
- Time zone: UTC+5:30 (IST)
- Postal code: 412405
- Telephone code: 02114
- ISO 3166 code: IN-MH
- Vehicle registration: MH-14
- Website: pune.nic.in

Awasari Khurd is a village in Ambegaon taluka of Pune district in the state of Maharashtra, India. The village is administered by a Sarpanch who is an elected representative of the village as per the constitution of India and Panchayati raj. Government College of Engineering and Research, Avasari Khurd, the government engineering institute started functioning in 2009 & the Government Polytechnic, Awasari Khurd in 2008, in the village.
