= Gohe Bk =

Village in Maharashtra

- Village
- Location in Maharashtra, India Gohe Bk (India)
- Country: India
- State: Maharashtra
- District: Pune
- Tehsil: Ambegaon

Government
  - Type: Panchayati raj (India)
  - Body: Gram panchayat

Languages
  - Official: Marathi
  - Other spoken: Hindi
- Time zone: UTC+5:30 (IST)
- Telephone code: 02114
- ISO 3166 code: IN-MH
- Vehicle registration: MH-14
- Website: pune.nic.in

Gohe Bk is a village in Ambegaon taluka of Pune District in the state of Maharashtra, India. The village is administrated by a Sarpanch who is an elected representative of village as per constitution of India and Panchayati raj (India).
