= Chincholi, Ambegaon =

Village in Maharashtra

Chincholi
- Village
- Location in Maharashtra, India Chincholi (India)
- Coordinates: 19°03′21.8″N 73°51′13.0″E
- Country: India
- State: Maharashtra
- District: Pune
- Tehsil: Ambegaon

Government
  - Type: Panchayati raj
  - Body: Gram panchayat

Population (2011)
  - Total: 1,311

Languages
  - Official: Marathi
  - Other spoken: Hindi
- Time zone: UTC+5:30 (IST)
- PIN: 410509
- Telephone code: 02114
- ISO 3166 code: IN-MH
- Vehicle registration: MH-14
- Website: pune.nic.in

Chincholi is a village in Ambegaon taluka of Pune district in the state of Maharashtra, India. The village is administrated by a Sarpanch—the elected representative—under the Constitution of India and the Panchayati raj system.

== Overview ==
Chincholi is located approximately 3 kilometres from the sub-district headquarters, Ghodegaon, and about 83 kilometres from the district headquarters, Pune. According to the 2011 Census, the village has location code 555483.

== Geography ==
The village covers an area of 375.59 hectares. It features a predominantly agricultural landscape and experiences a typical Monsoon climate, with moderate to heavy rainfall during the monsoon season. Good road connectivity ensures access to nearby towns and essential services.

== Demographics ==
As per the 2011 Census, Chincholi has a population of 1,311, comprising 664 males and 647 females, resulting in a sex ratio of 974 females per 1,000 males. The literacy rate is 80.63% (male: 86.14%, female: 74.96%).

== Village Statistics ==
=== Administrative and Geographical Details ===
Attribute	Details
Location Code	555483
Tehsil	Ambegaon taluka
District	Pune district
State	Maharashtra
Total Area	375.59 hectares
Pincode	410509

=== Demographics and Connectivity ===
Attribute	Details
Population (2011)	1,311
Households	287
Male Population	664
Female Population	647
Sex Ratio	974 females/1,000 males
Literacy Rate	80.63%
Nearest Town	Junnar (25 km)
Distance from Sub-District HQ	3 km
Distance from District HQ	83 km
Primary Economic Activity	Agriculture
Climate	Monsoon-type

== Infrastructure and Amenities ==
Chincholi benefits from essential infrastructure, including Schools, Healthcare centres, and local markets. The village is well-connected by road to neighbouring towns and cities, and rural development initiatives have improved water supply and sanitation facilities.

=== Education ===
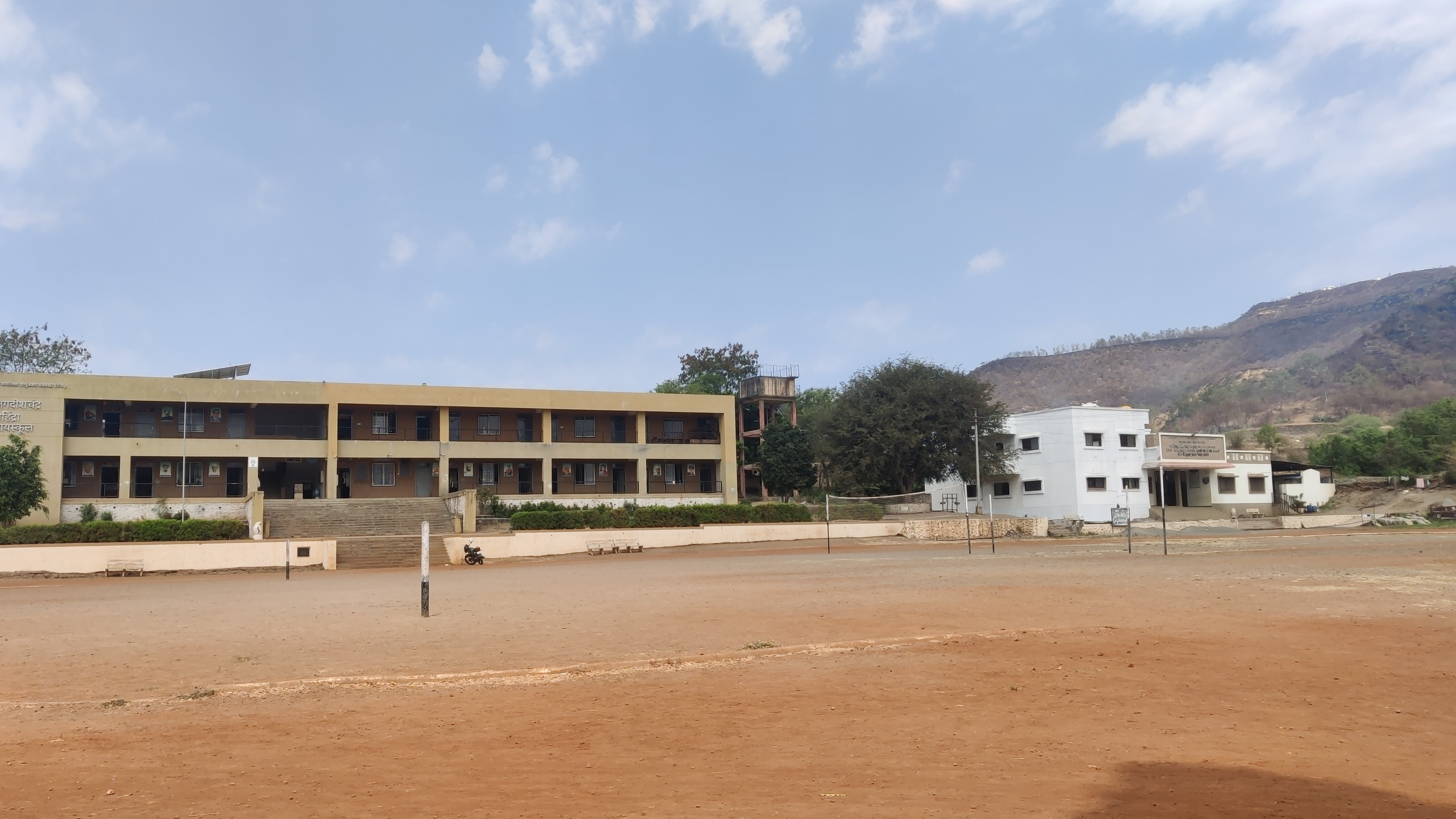
JagdeeshChand Mahindra High School, Chincholi, Ambegaon

The village is home to JagdeeshChand Mahindra High School, a primary and secondary educational institution. The school features a two-story academic building, administrative offices, and a large playground for extracurricular activities.

== Economy and Livelihood ==
Agriculture is the backbone of Chincholi's economy. Most residents are engaged in farming, cultivating crops such as Sugarcane, Wheat, and various Vegetables. Small-scale businesses and self-employment, supported by government schemes, also contribute to the local economy. For major commercial activities, banking, and higher education, residents rely on the nearby town of Junnar (approximately 25 kilometres away).

== Governance ==
The village is managed by a Gram panchayat, which oversees local administration, development projects, and the implementation of government policies. Regular public meetings are held to address community welfare and infrastructure improvements.
