= Mir Abdul Ali =

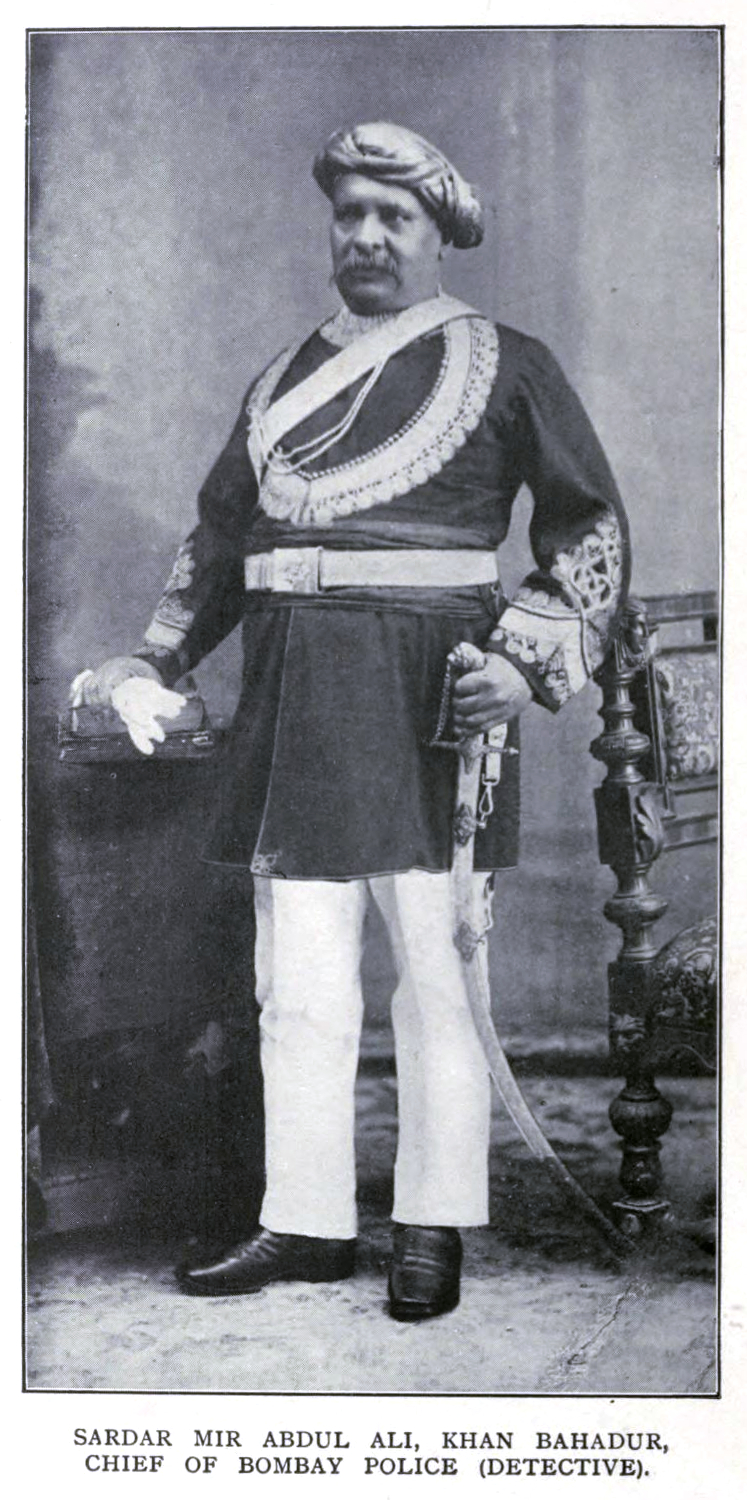

Mir Abdul Ali (August 1840 – 14 June 1906, service in the Bombay Police from 1865 to 1903) with the titles of Khan Bahadur and Sardar, was an Indian police detective who served with the British Police Force in Bombay City. His father Akbar Ali had also served in the police force and had earned a reputation for solving crimes and had retired with high honours. Abdul Ali continued in the tradition and was once known as the Sherlock Holmes of India.

== Career of his father ==
Abdul Ali's father Akbar Ali was born in 1802 in a family of Sayyids who had fled from the Abbasid Caliphs of Baghdad to settle in India. The family had been provided with a title to settle in the village of Manchar, Khed, where Mir Abdul Ali had been born. He was taught Marathi and Hindustani but his parents died young. By marriage he was linked to another Syed family from Narayangaon. He went to Bombay to seek employment and joined the Bombay Police Force on 1 September 1821 under Captain Shortt, Head of the Police. In 1840 he was sent to Aden to organize a police force there. In 1852 he became a Jamadar and in 1856, a Subedar. During the 1857 rebellion he helped the British police identify a critical informant who had intelligence on the plans of sepoys. In 1861, he received the title of Khan Bahadur. He demonstrated skills in solving several cases and in 1865, Akbar Ali was made an inspector. Among the cases he solved were currency forgeries and in one case he brought to book two forgers in Surat that included a European and an influential Indian. In another case he arrested a Chinese burglar named John Wynn. Yet another case was a mass poisoning in Kalbadevi where two women had died and three others had suffered from the poisoning. Akbar Ali retired with honours in December 1883. He died on 8 March 1894, at the age of 92. Abdul Ali worked with his father and helped the latter solve several cases even before joining the police force.

== Work in the Bombay Police ==
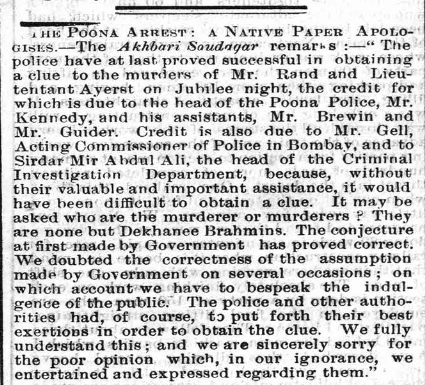
News report from 1897 noting Ali's role in the arrest of the Chapekar brothers

Abdul Ali passed the Matriculation Examination of Bombay University in 1865 and joined the Police force on 15 December of the same year. Abdul Ali solved his first case of a swindler named Karsandas Purushotamdas Bhansali in 1866 and in the same year also solved a case of currency forging. Another prominent case was the intentional burning of a ship, the S.S. Aurora, by its captain. He also helped locate Moulvi Liaqat Ali, an associate of Nana Saheb who was involved in murdering Europeans during 1857. Khan was hailed as an Indian "Sherlock Holmes". At Sir Frank Souter's recommendation, he too was conferred the title of Khan Bahadur in 1873. In the same year he helped uncover a murder plotted by a Bombay High Court solicitor and his clerk. Yet another investigation led to the charging of the Malharrao Gaekwar of Baroda of attempting to poison Colonel Phayre, the British Resident. In 1876 he uncovered a fraud involving contractors and forest department officers to illegally cut and trade in timber using false records. Sir Frank Souter noted in 1881 that on account of his being a native he was debarred from being a Superintendent. He was made a Justice of the Peace for the City of Bombay. Souter sought, on behalf of Ali, from the Government a suitable salary comparable to a 1st Class Police Inspector (ie Rs 250 with Rs 25 travelling allowance and additional cover for cost of living in Bombay). In 1881 Sir Frank Souter, Police Commissioner, recommended Ali to the title of First Class Sardar of the Deccan. This was seconded by Colonel Wilson and he received the title on 30 May 1891, signed by Viceroy Lansdowne. He received a Kaiser-i-Hind Gold medal in 1901. He retired in 1903.

A son of Abdul Ali Mir Sarfraz Ali who had trained as a lawyer in England died in Karachi in October 1896.

== Family Tree of Mir Abdul Ali ==
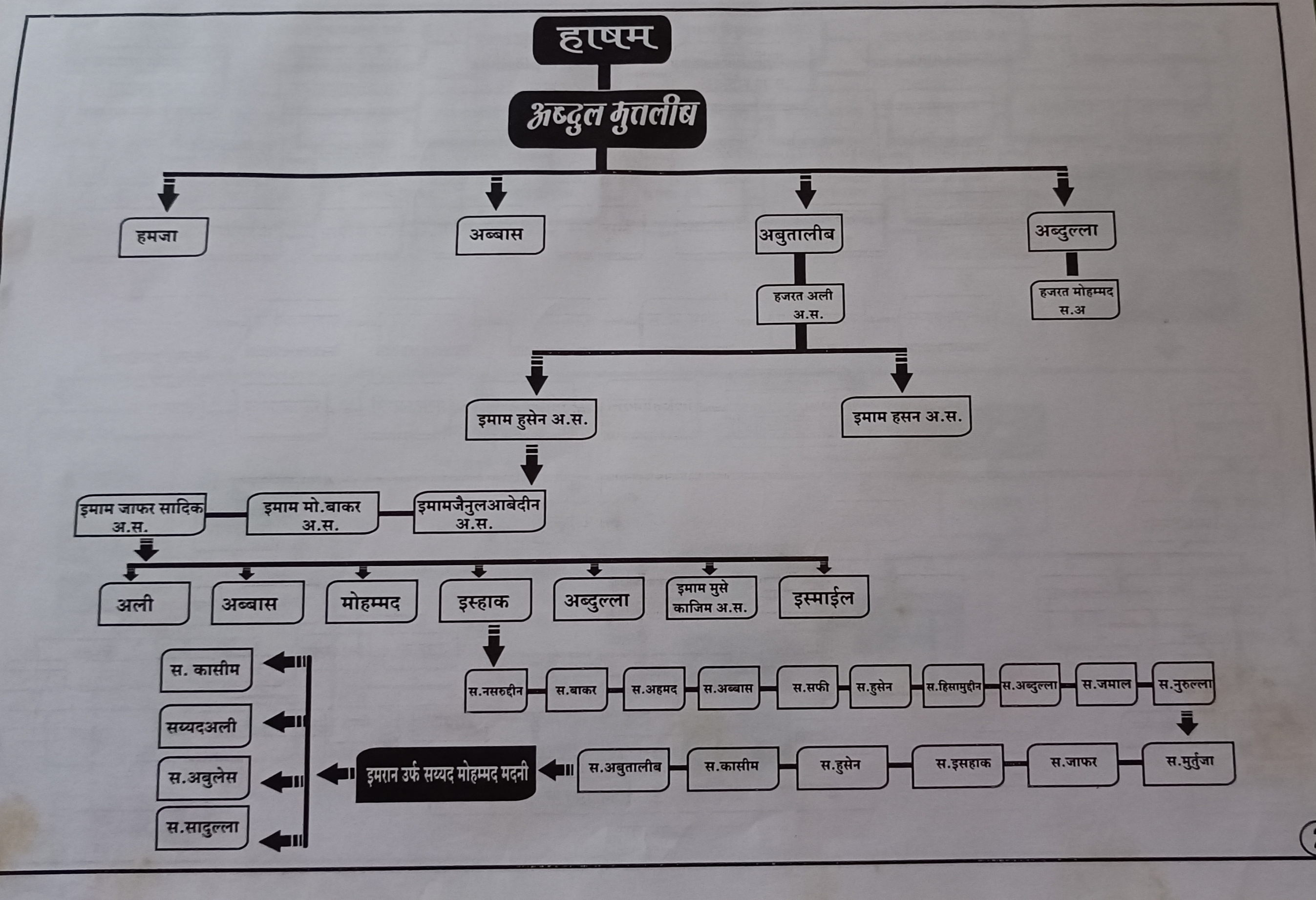
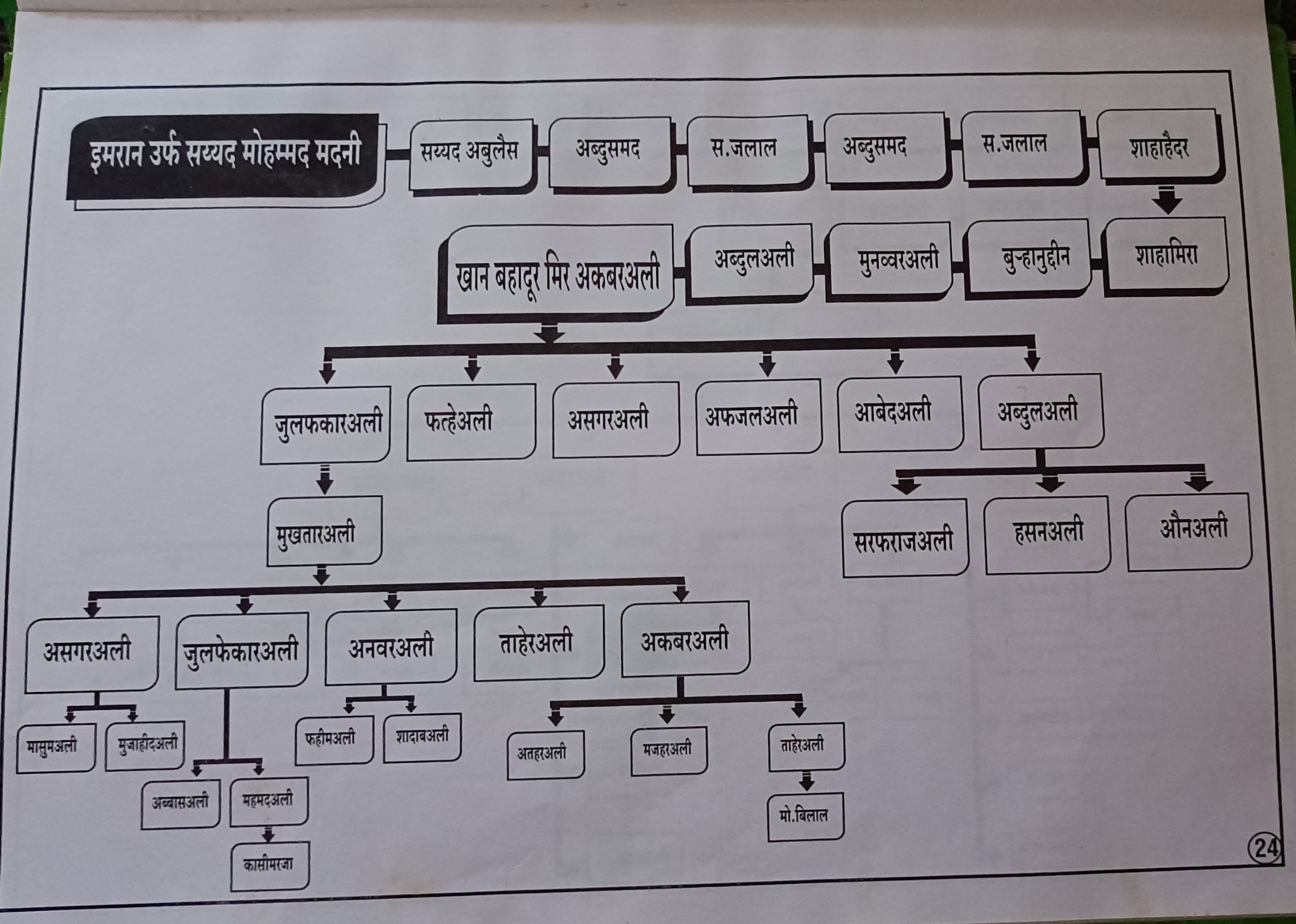
