= Parag Milk Foods =

Dairy company (e. 1992)

Parag Milk Foods Limited
- Company type: Public
- Traded as: BSE: 539889; NSE: PARAGMILK
- Industry: Dairy
- Founded: 1992; 34 years ago
- Headquarters: Mumbai and Pune, Maharashtra, India
- Area served: India
- Key people: Devendra Shah (Chairman)
- Products: Milk, butter, cheese, ghee, cottage cheese, yogurt and whey protein
- Revenue: ▲₹1,923 crore (US$200 million) (2018)
- Operating income: ▲₹1,865 crore (US$190 million) (2018)
- Total assets: ▲₹1,367 crore (US$140 million) (2018)
- Number of employees: 1,787 (as on 31 March 2018)
- Website: paragmilkfoods.com

Parag Milk Foods is a Pune-based private dairy.

== History ==
Parag Milk Foods started as a dairy in Manchar with a 20,000 litre capacity in 1992. It started with production of skimmed milk powder and by 2004 became India's largest exporter of the skimmed milk powder. However, the company faced a challenge when the Government of India banned export of milk powder on account of local milk shortage.

== Acquisitions ==
In 2018, Parag Milk Foods acquired Danone's facility in Sonipat, Haryana for ₹30 crore (US$3.1 million) after the latter decided to shut its dairy operations in India.
