= Dhamani, Ambegaon =

Village in Maharashtra

Dhamani
- Village
- Location in Maharashtra, India Dhamani (India)
- Country: India
- State: Maharashtra
- District: Pune
- Tehsil: Ambegaon

Government
  - Type: Panchayati raj (India)
  - Body: Current Sarpanch -Mrs.Borhade (Elected) Current

Population
  - Total: 2,814

Languages
  - Official: Marathi
  - Other spoken: Hindi
- Time zone: UTC+5:30 (IST)
- Postal code: 410508
- Telephone code: 02114
- ISO 3166 code: IN-MH
- Vehicle registration: MH-14
- Website: pune.nic.in

Dhamani is a village in Ambegaon taluka of Pune District in the state of Maharashtra, India. The village is administrated by a Sarpanch who is an elected representative of village as per constitution of India and Panchayati raj (India).

== Geographical location and population ==
Dhamani is a large village located in Ambegaon Taluka of Pune district, Maharashtra with total 673 families residing. The Dhamani village has population of 2814 of which 1384 are males while 1430 are females as per Population Census 2011.

== Literacy Rate ==
Dhamani village has lower literacy rate compared to Maharashtra. In 2011, literacy rate of Dhamani village was 80.27% compared to 82.34% of Maharashtra. In Dhamani Male literacy stands at 90.11% while female literacy rate was 70.86%.

== Educational Facility ==
In this village of Dhamani, there are two schools. One is the Jilha Parishad Prathamik Shala which is provided by the Government of Maharashtra providing primary education from 1st grade to 4th grade. The other school is Shri Shivaji Vidyalaya provided by Rayat Shikshan Sanstha based in Satara, Maharashtra, India. This school provides education from 5th grade to 11th and 12th grade for science stream. Nearby villages like Awasari Budruk, Pargaon Tarf Awasari Budruk, Pabal etcetera have colleges for graduation study.
