= Chincholi Wildlife Sanctuary =

Protected area in Karnataka, India

Coordinates: 17°30′00″N 77°30′00″E

- IUCN category IV (habitat/species management area)
- Interactive map of Chincholi Wildlife Sanctuary
- Location: Chincholi Taluka, Kalaburagi district
- Nearest city: Humnabad (56 km)
- Area: 134.88 sq mi (349.3 km^{2})
- Established: 2011 (15 years ago)
- Named for: Chincholi
- Governing body: Karnataka State Forest Department

Chincholi Wildlife Sanctuary, located in the Chincholi taluka of kalaburagi district of Karnataka, is the first drylands wildlife sanctuary in South India. Spanning an area of 134.88 square kilometers, it is known for its rich biodiversity and unique ecosystem. The sanctuary features dry and moist deciduous forests, with plantations of teak, acacia, sandalwood, and red sanders. It also hosts medicinal herbs and trees.

The sanctuary is home to a variety of fauna, including blackbuck, striped hyena, Indian wolf, golden jackal, Bengal fox, and fruit bats. Bird enthusiasts can spot over 35 species of birds, such as the blue pigeon, black-winged kite, blossom-headed parakeet, and black drongo. Additionally, the sanctuary includes the Chandrampalli Dam and four smaller dams, which support the local ecosystem.

== Overview ==
Chincholi Wildlife Sanctuary spans over an area of 134.88 km^{2}. It is situated in the Kalaburagi district of Karnataka in India. It is the first dryland wildlife sanctuary in the Hyderabad-Karnataka region.

== Flora and fauna ==
The sanctuary has medicinal herbs and trees in its compound. It also has acacia and teak plantations. Chincholi Wildlife Sanctuary has over 35 species of birds, such as blue pigeon, black-winged kite, blossom-headed parakeet, black drongo and many more. It hosts all four wildlife species from the Canidae family found in Karnataka. These include dholes, wolves, golden jackals, and Bengal foxes.
