= Pune–Nashik rail line =

Railway line in India

Pune–Nasik railway line

Overview
- Status: Survey – done; Feasibility Report – Done; Submission to Planning Commission for appraisal – Done; Approval by Planning Commission – Yes; Land Acquisition – Started; Construction – No
- Locale: Maharashtra, India
- Termini: Pune; Nasik Road
- Stations: 20 (proposed)
- Website: https://www.maharail.com/project-pune_nashik.php

History
- Planned opening: 2029

Technical
- Line length: 231 km (144 mi)
- Track length: 231 km (144 mi)
- Track gauge: 1,676 mm (5 ft 6 in)

The Pune–Nasik railway line is a proposed higher speed railway between the cities of Pune and Nashik. The project will allow trains to cover the 235.5 km route in around two hours at speeds of up to 200 km/h, including future-proofing for 250 km/h.

Once completed this will link two of the most important industrial cities of India and thus will complete Maharashtra's industrial triangle (Mumbai, Pune and Nashik) link by rail. This will also benefit growth of trade and commerce in both cities and also will help growth of rural industries on the route. This link will also benefit some spiritual destinations like Bhimashankar Jyotirlinga, Vighneshwara Temple at Ojhar (part of the Ashtavinayaka) and Lenyadri and Pabal Jain temple. The new industrial zone at Chakan, Rajgurunagar and Sinnar area will get a rail connectivity by this project. for this railway line recently notice for land acquisition in khed tahsil has been published by the Khed taluka administration and fixed limitations of 15 days to raise objection regarding rate and other issues

It will be funded from a mixture of stat government and private investor money.

== Route ==
Old Plan

The total length of this route initially was 265 km out of which 34 km between Pune Junction and Talegaon is already existing and 32 km between Nasik Road and Sinnar (Gulwanch) was under land acquiring process. The Nasik road to Sinnar/Gulwanch section requires land from ten villages Eklahare, Hinganwedhe and Jakori in Nashik, Jogaltembi, Nayangaon, Dashwandi, Patpimri, Baragaon Pimpri and Gulwanch in Sinnar taluka and Pimpalgaon-Nipani in Niphad Taluka. Due to the length of route this plan was scrapped. (265 km by rail compared to 202 km by road between Pune and Nashik road)

New plan

However this route was revised and now will be 231 km instead of old 265 km. The new route will divert from Manjari Budruk (11 km from Pune Junction) instead of old diversion from Talegaon. There will be total of 24 stations out of which 8 are major and 16 minor. The route will also include 18 tunnels. As of 2023, the project is on hold due to several issues, including shortage of funds. There will be major stations at Chakan, Rajgurunagar, Manchar, Narayangaon, Ale Phata, Sangamner, Sinnar and Satpur. This will be a double track project supporting speed of 200 - 250 kph. Operation speed will be restricted to 140 km/h and is expected to reduce journey time to 2 hours.

Third Plan

According new plan by Maharashtra Deputy CM Devendra Fadnavis new alignment will go via Shirdi. This will benefit pilgrims from Pune and Nashik going to Shirdi. This plan will increase distance of 235 km by 30 km to 265 km.

== Rolling stock ==
The depot for the rolling stock of the new line will be at Nasik Road, and will be operated by 10 electric multiple unit trainsets. These multiple units will each be 6 coaches long, will have the capacity for 450 passengers, and will be fully electric, running on 25kV AC supplied by overhead cable. Eight runs daily between Pune and Nashik will be scheduled for each consist. The line's signalling will be ETCS Level 2 cab signalling, likely with a lineside backup. Cab signalling will allow for trains to operate at higher speeds than conventional signalling permits, due to info about the line being transmitted directly into the train cab, rather than relying on lineside signals to determine whether the line is clear or not, which train drivers can struggle to interpret at speed.
