= Ghodegaon =

Village in Pune district, Maharashtra, India

- Village
- Location in Maharashtra, India Ghodegaon (India)
- Country: India
- State: Maharashtra
- District: Pune
- Tehsil: Ambegaon

Government
  - Type: Panchayati raj (India)
  - Body: Gram panchayat

Languages
  - Official: Marathi
- Time zone: UTC+5:30 (IST)
- Telephone code: 02133
- ISO 3166 code: IN-MH
- Vehicle registration: MH-14

Ghodegaon is a village in Ambegaon taluka of Pune district in the state of Maharashtra, India.

== History ==
In the late nineteenth century, Ghodegaon was described in the Gazetteer of the Bombay Presidency as the headquarters of the Ambegaon petty division in Khed. The gazetteer recorded its population as 4,923 in 1872 and 4,893 in 1881, and noted that a weekly market was held on Fridays. It also mentioned a school, a post office, and an old mosque.

The same source states that the mosque had a three-arched front and two minarets, and that a Persian inscription recorded that it was built around 1580 by one Mir Muhammad. The gazetteer also notes that in 1839 a band of Kolis threatened the petty divisional treasury at Ghodegaon, but that the attack was resisted by Assistant Collector Mr. Rose and local townspeople.

== Culture ==
Ghodegaon has a traditional association with the wooden palang used in rituals connected with the Tulja Bhavani temple at Tuljapur. Marathi newspaper coverage has reported that the palang is traditionally prepared at Ghodegaon by members of the Thakur family and is then taken onward in procession towards Tuljapur during the Navratri season.
