= Kadbanwadi =

Village in Maharashtra

- Village
- Location in Maharashtra, India
- Coordinates: 18.0724794°N 74.8360918°E
- Country: India
- State: Maharashtra
- Division: Pune division
- District: Pune

Area
  - Total: 27.66 km^{2} (10.68 sq mi)

Population
  - Total: 1,636
  - Density: 59.15/km^{2} (153.2/sq mi)

Languages
  - Official: Marathi, Hindi
- Time zone: UTC+5:30 (IST)
- PIN: 413114
- Telephone code: 02111

Kadbanwadi is a village in the Indapur tehsil of Pune district, Maharashtra, India. It is located at a distance of 234 km from the state capital Mumbai. The village is known for the water conservation initiatives taken by a resident, Bhajandas Pawar, which helped transform the village into a self-sufficient gram. Kadbanwadi has 100 farm ponds, 3 percolation tank, 27 cement bunds, and 110 earthen bunds.

== Agriculture ==
This "Adarsh Gram" or model village is also famous for its polyhouse farming. As per the report of Agro Climatic, the village is a water scarcity zone in Maharashtra, with less than 400mm of rainfall per year. Most of the villagers used to feed shepherds and practice animal husbandry. The forestlands have a great floral and faunal diversity.

== The impact of water conservation ==
The impact of water conservation reflects in the agricultural practices of the village. While farmers were increasingly dependent on rainfall to grow jowar and bajra earlier, today over 500 hectares of agricultural land is used to grow pomegranates. These pomegranates are making inroads into markets in major cities like Pune, Hyderabad, Mumbai and Bengaluru and exported too. Over 200 hectares of land is used to cultivate other revenue earning crops like sugarcane and various vegetables and seasonal crops.
