= Kanse =

Village in Maharashtra

- village
- Interactive map of Kanse
- Country: India
- State: Maharashtra

Languages
  - Official: Marathi
- Time zone: UTC+5:30 (IST)

Kanse is a village located in Ambegaon tehsil in Pune district, Maharashtra state in India. Shri Bhimashankar Temple is hardly 40 km away from Kanse

Kanse and Shinoli are 2 villages separated by Ghod river. Most of the resident population is Maratha's and the native language is Marathi. The village economy is dependent on farming. Poultry is another big business in Kanse. Major crops are sugar cane, potatoes, onions, jowar and bajra. Borhade families happen to constitute the majority of the population in Kanse and Shinoli. Kanse Village awarded with "best grampanchayat" under gramswachyata abhiyan. The temple of Shree Kalbhairavnath is gram daivat of all villagers. The annual yatra of Kalbhairavnath held on Chaitra Sudhha Ashtami. Mohwadi, Malwadi, Waghwadi, Walunjwadi are the wadis of Village Kanse. Many villagers shifted to Mumbai (specially in Ghatkopar area) in search of work. G Godrej and Boyce Mfg. Co.Ltd is the major employer for these villagers.

Bhimashankar is about an hour-long drive from Kanse. Shivneri Fort is also an hour-long drive from this village.
