= Dhamankhel =

Village in Maharashtra

- village
- Location in Maharashtra, India Dhamankhel (India)
- Coordinates: 19°11′N 73°53′E
- Country: India
- State: Maharashtra
- District: Pune

Government
  - Body: Grampanchayat Dhamankhel धामणखेल, Sarpanch -Shri.Santosh Jadhav. सरपंच- श्री.संतोष जाधव.

Languages
  - Official: Marathi
- Time zone: UTC+5:30 (IST)
- Telephone code: 912132
- Vehicle registration: MH-14
- Coastline: 0 kilometres (0 mi)
- Nearest city: Naryangaon
- Avg. summer temperature: 35–40 °C (95–104 °F)

Dhamankhel is a village situated at about 3 km from Junnar city of Pune district. is a village located approximately 3 kilometres from Junnarcity in the Pune district of Maharashtra, India. The village is renowned for the Temple of Lord Khandoba, who is worshipped as the family deity (kuladevata) by all families residing in the village.

== Festivals ==
Festivals celebrated in "Shree Martand Bhairav Khandoba Mandir."

Annually 4 festivals are being celebrated with great enthusiasm & bhakti. They are as follows.

1. Champashashti (Wangasat)

2. Magh Poornima

3. Chaitra Poornima

Champashathi is a day when Lord Khandoba is said to have slain the asura brothers "Mani & Malya" therefore he is known as "Malhari". This is a day when Lord Shiva took an Avatar of Shri Khandoba.

This celebration start from one week or 7 days before Champashasti Day. Seven day series known as "Saptah" where bhajans & Kirtans (devotional songs and hymns) take place. Champashashti Day starts with a grand yajna or Havan at the temple place in the early Morning (4:00 a.m). Then holy bath of Lord Khandoba. Then the aarti of Khandoba is perform (6:00 a.m). Then temple is open for the darshan to all devotees.

Following the ceremony, an effigy of Lord Khandoba is placed in the Palakhi(palanquin) and carried in procession around the temple. After completing the procession, the effigy is placed in the centre of the temple where devotees may offer darshan. Mahaprasad is distributed to devotees following the completion of "Kalyache Kirtan". Throughout the day devotees perform "Jagaran & Gondhal" ritual within temple premises. The observances from part of the temple's annual regilious celebrations.

Magh Poornima is celebrated on the full moon day i.e. poornima of the Magh month of the Hindu calendar. Celebration starts with the holy bath of the deity Shree Khandoba in the early morning. After the pooja and other holy rituals temple is opened for darshan. People from surrounding areas and long distances visit this place every year and pay their offerings in the form of Aggarbattis, Gulal, Bhandar, etc. Another important ritual of this procession is "Harture" (Har means garland made up of flowers) starts form a specific point(generally from Valunj Baba Temple). Bullock carts are decorated for this procession. Bullocks carts that consist of 4 bullocks is treated like a "Rath" of deity (Shree Khandoba). Yellow flags are put on both the sides of the bullock cart. People gather in large crowds for this special occasion. The procession is followed by local musicians & dancers performing traditional lejhim dances in front of Harture. These dances continue till the Harture reaches Khandoba Temple.

Another major attraction of this festival is the bullock cart racing competition. This is one of the most famous activities among all the people gathered for the occasion, four bullocks have to reach the final destination within stipulated time allotted. The Bullock Cart which completes the race with the least time is being declared a winner. The competition continues till night descends or sometimes the next day, too. The other side of the temple is full of devotees taking the darshan of Lord Khandoba.
