= Chincholi Morachi =

Village in Maharashtra

Chincholi Morachi Morachi Chincholi
- village
- Location in Maharashtra, India Chincholi Morachi (India)
- Coordinates: 18.815572°N 74.156502°E
- Country: India
- State: Maharashtra
- District: Pune

Government
  - Type: Sarpanch- Grampanchayat

Languages
  - Official: Marathi
- Time zone: UTC+5:30 (IST)
- PIN: 412218
- Vehicle registration: MH-12
- Nearest city: Pune
- Literacy: 80%%
- Lok Sabha constituency: Shirur
- Avg. summer temperature: 40 °C (104 °F)
- Avg. winter temperature: 20 °C (68 °F)

Chincholi Morachi is a village near Pune-Ahmednagar Highway about 55km from Pune.It is known for its large population of peafowl
