= Maharashtra State Board of Technical Education =

Autonomous board of education in the state of Maharashtra, India

Maharashtra State Board of Technical Education.
- Formation: August 1963; 62 years ago
- Type: Autonomous Board of Education
- Headquarters: Mumbai, India
- Location: 49, Kherwadi, Bandra East, Mumbai 400 051
- Members: Government of Maharashtra
- Official language: English
- Website: msbte.ac.in

The Maharashtra State Board of Technical Education (MSBTE) is an autonomous board of education in the state of Maharashtra, India. It designs and implements diploma, post diploma and advanced diploma programs to affiliated institutions. The board was established in 1963 to cater the increasing needs of affiliated institutions and their students.

== History ==
The establishment of a separate board responsible for higher education dates back to 1963. Before the country's independence for British Raj, diploma courses in Engineering and Technology were provided institutions like the College of Engineering, Pune, Veermata Jijabai Technological Institute, Mumbai, Cusrow Wadia Institute of Technology, Pune and Government Polytechnic, Nagpur. A Directorate of Technical Education was set up in 1948 to control technical education in all levels. As industrial development increased, the demand for diploma courses also did, and the government established a separate Board of Technical Examinations in August 1963. It was later renamed to Maharashtra State Board of Technical Education and given an autonomous status in 1999.

MSBTE conduct Summer and Winter Exams every six months. The Summer exams are held during April/May Month and Winter exams are held during November/December month.

MSBTE also conducts industrial training for 4th semester engineering diploma students after their 4th semester examination. The duration of this industrial training is six weeks.

== Affiliated Institutes ==
All polytechnic institutes in the maharashtra are affiliated to MSBTE, out of which 43 are Government Polytechnic institutes. A total of 26 institutes are affiliated to the board.

1. Government Polytechnic, Ramwadi, Pen
2. Government Polytechnic, Mumbai
3. M.H. Saboo Siddik, Byculla, Mumbai
4. Vidyalankar Polytechnic, Wadala, Mumbai
5. Shah and Anchor Kutchhi Polytechnic, Chembur, Mumbai
6. Godavari Engineering and Polytechnic, Jalgaon,
7. V.E.S. Polytechnic, Chembur, Mumbai
8. Government Polytechnic, Pune
9. Anand Charitable Sanstha's Diploma in Engineering & Technology Ashti
10. Government Polytechnic, Awasari Kh
11. Vidya Prasarak Mandals Polytechnic, Thane
12. Cusrow Wadia Institute of Technology, Pune
13. Walchand College of Engineering, Sangli
14. Government Polytechnic, Karad
15. Government Polytechnic, Kolhapur
16. Institute of Civil and Rural Engineering, Gargoti, Kolhapur
17. Government Polytechnic, Ratnagiri
18. Government Polytechnic, Solapur
19. P.L. Government Polytechnic, Latur
20. Shikshan Maharshi Dadasaheb Rawal Government Polytechnic, Dhule
21. Government Polytechnic, Jalgaon
22. Government Polytechnic, Aurangabad
23. Government Polytechnic, Nanded
24. Government Polytechnic, Khamgaon.
25. St John college of engineering and technology palghar
26. SSVPS College of Engineering and Polytechnic, Dhule
27. Mandar Education Society, Maharashtra
28. Sandip Polytechnic, Nashik
29. VIVA College of Diploma Engg. & Tech., Virar
30. Shree Shankar Narayan Education Trust, Pravin Patil College of Diploma Engg. & Technology, Bhayandar East, Mumbai

== See also ==
- List of Government Polytechnic Colleges in Maharashtra
