= Chincholi, Junnar =

Village in Maharashtra, India

Chincholi is a village in Junnar Taluka of Pune District, Maharashtra, India. It is located 12 kilometres (7.5 mi) from Junnar City and 10 kilometres (6.2 mi) from Shivneri Fort.
