= Ale, Maharashtra =

Village in Maharashtra

Ale Alephata
- town
- Location in Maharashtra, India Ale (India)
- Coordinates: 19.17°N 74.12°E
- Country: India
- State: Maharashtra
- District: Pune

Languages
  - Official: Marathi
- Time zone: UTC+5:30 (IST)
- ISO 3166 code: IN-MH

Ale is a small village residing on intersection of Nagar-kalyan highway and Pune-Nashik highway in Junnar Taluka of Pune District of Maharashtra state in India

== Importance ==
Venue: Ale Reda Samadhi, Junnar, Pune

Elevation: 860 m.

The intersection of National Highway 50 and National Highway 222, hence it is a very important market place.

A village named Ale is near from alephata. The land of Ale is holy by the visit of saint Dnyaneshwar who wrote famous Hindu granth Dyaneshwari. About educational richness; the area is surrounded by schools, college having all general streams which includes B.A, BCom, BSc, and other specialization including BCA, BCS, BHMS, Engineering & Pharmacy offering both Diploma and Degree.
