= Manchar =

- Town
- Location in Maharashtra, India
- Coordinates: 19.0°N 73.93°E
- Country: India
- State: Maharashtra
- District: Pune

Government
  - Type: Nagar Panchayat
  - Body: Manchar Nagar Panchayat
- Elevation: 682 m (2,238 ft)

Population (2023 estimated)
  - Total: 25,900

Languages
  - Official: Marathi
- Time zone: UTC+5:30 (IST)
- Postal code: 410503
- ISO 3166 code: IN-MH
- Vehicle registration: MH 14
- Website: maharashtra.gov.in mancharnagarpanchayat.in

Manchar is a census town and Nagar panchayat in Ambegaon taluka of Pune district in the Indian state of Maharashtra. Nearby villages are Kalamb, Pimpalgoan, and Landewadi. It is governed by Manchar Nagar Panchayat which is second Nagar panchayat in the Pune district.

== Transport ==
Manchar is a town connected to Nashik & Pune through Nashik-Pune Road. Daily PMPML bus trips are arrange between Bhosari Terminal and Manchar.123456

== Geography ==
Manchar is located at 19.0°N 73.93°E. It has an average elevation of 682 metres (2237 feet).

Manchar is a market place on Pune-Nashik Highway and Pune- Bhimashankar Road.

Manchar railway station is a proposed railway station between Pune–Nashik Railway line in Pune district of Maharashtra. The station will be built in Manchar a suburb of pune.

== Demographics ==
Manchar is a Census Town city in the district of Pune, Maharashtra. The Manchar Census Town has a population of 18,876 of which 9,643 are males while 9,233 are females as per report released by Census India 2011.

The population of Children with the age of 0-6 is 2285 which is 12.11% of the total population of Manchar (CT). In Manchar Census Town, the female sex ratio is 957 against state average of 929. Moreover, the child sex ratio in Manchar is around 941 compared to the Maharashtra state average of 894. The literacy rate of Manchar city is 89.66% higher than the state average of 82.34%. In Manchar, male literacy is around 93.27% while the female literacy rate is 85.91%.

Schedule Tribe (ST) constitutes 6.27% while Schedule Caste (SC) were 5.35% of the total population in Manchar (CT).

Out of total population, 7,537 were engaged in work or business activity. Of this 5,312 were males while 2,225 were females. In census survey, worker is defined as person who does business, job, service, and cultivator and labour activity. Of total 7537 working population, 95.37% were engaged in Main Work while 4.63% of total workers were engaged in Marginal Work.

Manchar Census Town has total administration over 4,227 houses to which it supplies basic amenities like water and sewerage. It is also authorized to build roads within Census Town limits and impose taxes on properties coming under its jurisdiction.

Manchar 2023 Population

Current estimated population of Manchar Census Town in 2023 is approximately 25,900. The schedule census of 2021 for Manchar city is postponed due to covid. We believe new population census for Manchar city will be conducted in 2023 and same will be updated once its done. The current data for Manchar town are estimated only but all 2011 figures are accurate.

This town was under the control of Sayyed Muhammad (Madani) whose 5th forefather Sayyed Jafar migrated to India from Arab during the Abbasid Caliphs in the 13th century, Till today there is an old building constructed with clay and calcium, called Auliya dada dargah near Auliya dada Chowk Kazipura. Sayyed Muhammad's family is still in manchar and they have the hierarchy from their ancestor (Family Tree) in the form of a Book, the name of the Book is Gulshane Sadate Jafri and this book is written in Hindi and Urdu Language which shows Shia Community in Manchar. Most of the sons of Sayyed Muhammad Madni got titles like Inamdar, Jamadar, Meer.

Mir Abdul Ali is also descendant of Sayyed Muhammad Madni who was an Indian police detective. There are total of 4 mosques in manchar Shahi Masjid and Ruhollah Khomeini Masjid in Juna Bail Bazar, Raushan Masjid in Kazipura, and another one is in Chhatrapati Shivaji Maharaj Chowk. The Shriram temple near Weekly Bazaar place, was constructed by Sardar Holkar, and Shaligram (Kulkarni) family of Manchar was appointed by Sardar Holkar for daily Puja and attendance. The Indore state was sending a yearly grant for the temple till c. 1960. There is a trust of this temple. The Shaligram( Kulkarni) family is staying since 1350. The first person of this family was Shri. Keshav alias Shri. Gangadharpant. Now the majority of these families have shifted to Pune. The place has ancient references. The horse of Babhruvahan, Tapaneshwar Temple, and nearby well dug by Pandvas, are some of the ancient proofs. In the ancient time Manchar was on the commercial highway of Paithan to Junnar. For the travelers on this road, a drinking water well was constructed by a prominent person Shri, Ladideo of Manchar in 1344. These remarks are still appearing on a Sheela-Lekh carved on walls of (present) sweeming-well [ Pohonyaachi Baarav] in weekly market area. Manchar is a market place. Due to nearness of Pune, Mumbai the place has agricultural, commercial, and industrial importance. Jadhav mala besides the god river on the outskirts of city was first the main village. Nearby area: Nighotwadi, Mordewadi, Shewalwadi, Landewadi, Bankhele wasti, Vadgaon Kashimbeg, Santwadi (Hanuman Mandir), Bhekemala, Chandoli, Awasari, Walunjwadi. Government College of Engineering and Research Avasari Khurd is 3 km away from Manchar.

Parag Milk Foods has a major base and dairy operations in Manchar.
