= Ambegaon taluka =

Ambegaon
- Taluka
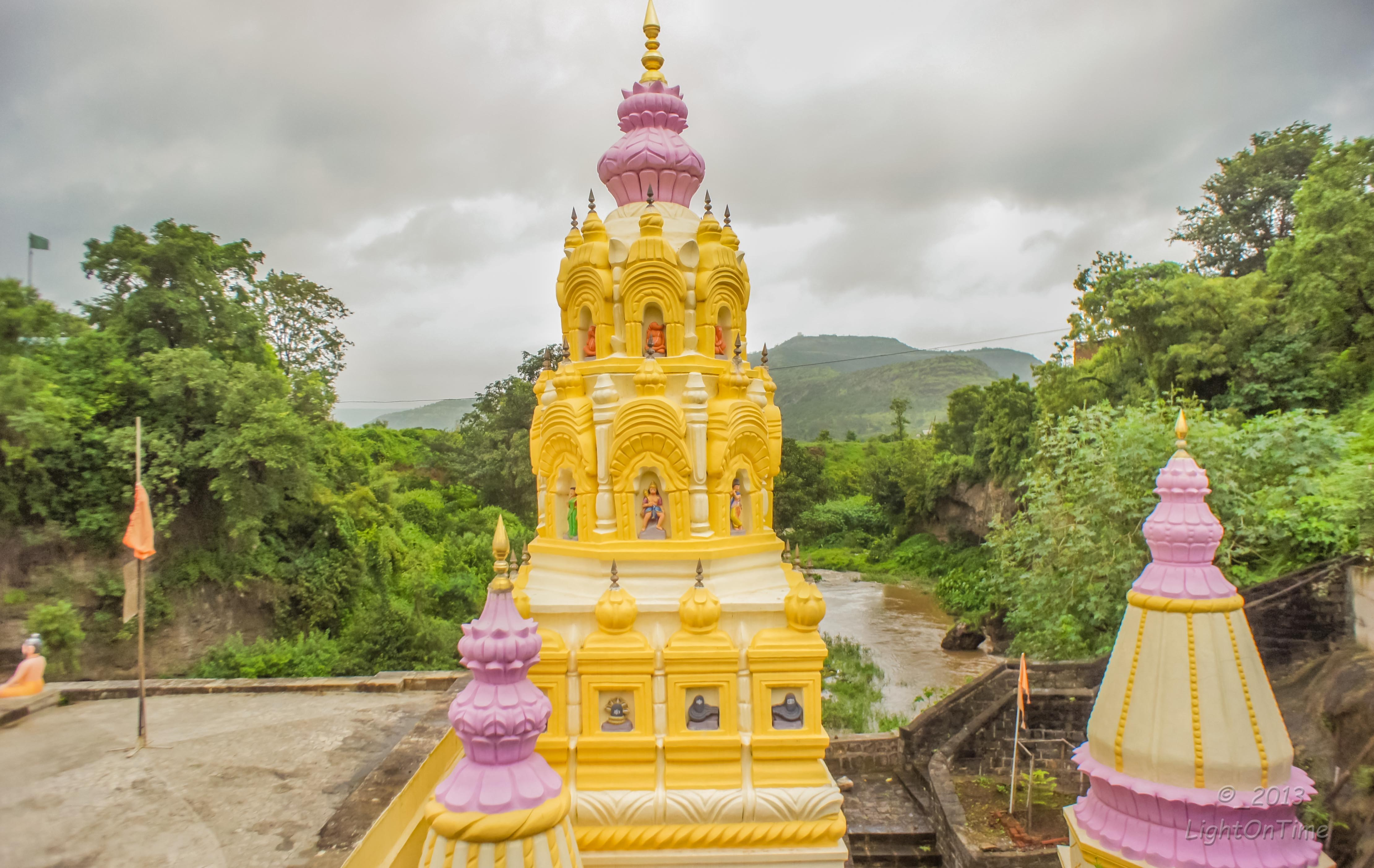
- Harishchandra Mahadev Mandir, Ghodegaon

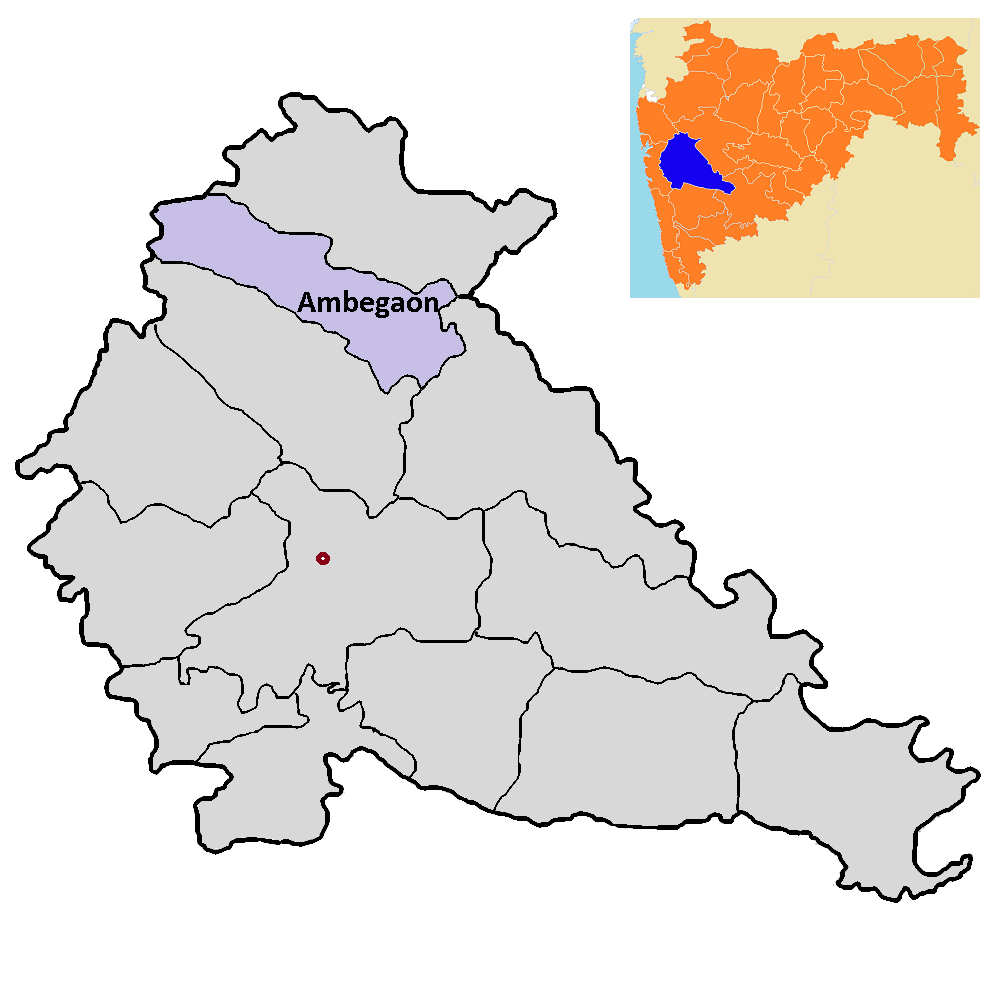

- Location within Maharashtra
- Coordinates: 19°2′5″N 73°50′11″E
- Country: India
- State: Maharashtra
- District: Pune
- Headquarter: Ghodegaon

Government
  - MLA: Dilip Walse Patil

Population (2011)
  - Total: 222,475
- Time zone: UTC+5:30 (IST)

Ambegaon taluka is a taluka in Shirur subdivision of Pune district of state of Maharashtra in India. One of the twelve most revered Shiva temples or Jyotirlinga, the Bhimashankar Temple is in Khed taluka. But due to Bhimashankar Sanctuary, the road is through Ambegaon taluka.

== Geography ==
The Taluka lies at the foothills of eastern side of the Sahyadri Mountain range, and towards the west side of Pune city. The taluka's administrative limits are from the cities of Bhimashankar in North to Loni in its South and from Peth in East to Kalamb in its West direction. This taluka is geographically divided in two parts due to the patterns of rainfall. The northern region gets far less rainfall than mountainous southern side of the taluka. The rivers Meena, Ghodnadi and Vellnadi flow through the area.

=== 2014 Malin landslide ===
In 2014, a serious mudslide around the village of Malin killed around 200 people. The landslides were caused by heavy rainfall that began a day prior, with the village receiving 10.8 cm (4 in) of rain on 29 July of that year and the downpour continuing throughout the following day. The environmental factors that resulted in the landslide is believed to have had more than one cause. One major cause was negligence of geological facts of the area before any construction or civil developmental process. Another cause cited for contributing to the landslide was rapid deforestation in the area. Deforestation removes not only trees, but also root structures that hold together the soil. Through deforestation, the soil of the surrounding land was made soft, and experts argue that deforestation was the primary underlying anthropogenic cause of the landslide. One additional reason was changing agricultural practices – villagers had then recently shifted from cultivation of rice and finger millet to wheat, which required leveling of steep areas, which contributed to instability of the hills. Also the construction of the Dimbhe Dam ten years ago near this area was considered as a contributing factor. The instability of the hillsides was due to the construction activities, which are often done without careful analysis of environmental consequences. Stone quarrying, among other types of construction, was specifically blamed for the instability of the hillside.

=== Flora and fauna ===
Deciduous Forests cover area around Bhimashankar. The Forests in the area have trees like Teak, Oak, Mango. The forest inhabits animals like Rabbit, Deer, Wolf, Fox, Tiger and Leopards. Birds found in the area include Peacock, Bulbul, and Parrot. Bhimashankar Wildlife Sanctuary was created in the area in order to protect the habitat of the Indian Giant Squirrel. Its area is 131 km^{2} (51 mi^{2}) and is a part of the Western Ghats (Sahyadri Ranges). This sanctuary was created in 1984 and includes 9 tribal villages. This area's biodiversity has been retained as it will be preserved as a cluster of sacred groves for generations. These sacred groves act as gene pools of this area, from where seeds were dispersed. Inside the Ahupe village's sacred grove in the sanctuary (where a tribe of Mahadev Koli resides) in 1984, a climber plant called Khombhal or Xantolis tomentosa was found to be 800–1000 years old.

== Demographics ==
Religions in Ambegaon taluk (2011)
Religion	Percent
Hinduism	94.81%
Islam	6.19%
Buddhism	1.81%
Jainism	0.55%
Other or not stated	0.29%

Ambegaon taluka has a population of 235,972 according to the 2011 census. Ambegaon had a literacy rate of 82.94% and a sex ratio of 979 females per 1000 males. 24,375 (10.33%) are under 7 years of age. 18,876 (8.00%) lived in urban areas. Scheduled Castes and Scheduled Tribes make up 4.13% and 21.49% of the population respectively.

Languages of Ambegaon taluk (2011)
1. Marathi (94.2%)
2. Hindi (2.34%)
3. Urdu (1.04%)
4. Others (2.38%)

At the time of the 2011 Census of India, 94.24% of the population in the district spoke Marathi, 2.34% Hindi and 1.04% Urdu as their first language.

The taluka has 142 villages from which the two towns of Manchar and Ghodegaon have a sizable population.

== Villages ==
- Adivare
- Aghane
- Ahupe
- Amade
- Ambedara
- Ambegaon
- Amondi
- Apati
- Asane
- Awasari Budruk
- Awasari Khurd
- Bhagadi
- Bharadi
- Bhawadi
- Bhorwadi
- Borghar
- Chandoli Budruk
- Chandoli Khurd
- Chaptewadi Kanas
- Chas
- Chikhali
- Chinchodi
- Chincholi
- Devgaon
- Dhakale
- Dhamani
- Dhondmal Shindewadi
- Digad
- Dimbhe Bk
- Dimbhe Kh
- Don
- Eklahare
- Falakewadi
- Gadewadi
- Gawarwadi
- Gavdewadi
- Gangapur Budruk
- Gangapur Khurd
- Gohe Bk
- Gohe Kh
- Jambhori
- Jarkarwadi
- Jawale
- Kadewadi
- Kalewadi Darekarwadi
- Kanase
- Karegaon
- Kathapur Budruk
- Khadakamala
- Khadaki
- Khadakwadi
- Koldara Gonawadi
- Kolharwadi
- Koltavade
- Kolwadi Kotamdara
- Kondhare
- Kondhaval
- Kurwandi
- Kushire Budruk
- Kushire Khurd
- Kadbanwadi
- Lauki
- Loni
- Manchar
- Mahalunge tarf Ghoda
- Shewalwadi Landewadi
- Nirgudsar
- Pahaddara
- Panchale Budruk
- Panchale Khurd
- Pargaon tarf Awasari Budruk
- Pargaon tarf Khed
- Patan
- Peth

== Economy ==
Agriculture is the main occupation of this region. Rivers like Ghod and Dhimbe provide water for cultivation. Dhimbe dam allows irrigation for cash crops. The most commonly grown crop is millet and vegetables like Potato are commonly grown too. In northern region, wheat, Jawari (also known as Durra) and Bajari (Pearl millet) are most commonly grown crops whereas in southern region rice is grown. Tomato and fruits like Grapes and Banana are also grown. The cultivated area of the taluka is approximately 87851 hectares. Significant crops are in the table below:

Crop	Area Under Cultivation (Hectares)
Kharip (Monsoon) Potato	2500
Potato	3000
Tomato	7500
Bajari	1000
Peanuts	1200
Rabbi (Winter) Onion	1200
Grapes	50
. Sugarcane as major crop in eastern part of the taluka.

Oil pressing (extracting) plants & refineries are also found in the region. Recently a new sugar factory has been constructed named as Bhimashankar sakhar karkhana. The taluka also has a sizeable dairy industry. There are 197 organisations in the area related to milk production.

=== Transport ===
National Highway no. 50 linking the cities of Pune and Nasik goes through the taluka. There is also a State Highway linking cities of Shirur to Bhimashankar via Manchar. At present there are no rail links in the taluka.

== Education ==
=== Primary and secondary education ===
State Primary Schools in the Taluka are run by the Zila parishad. Private schools along with secondary schools in the taluka are run by charitable trusts. All schools are required to undergo mandatory inspection by the Zila parishad. Mode of instruction is either in Marathi or English. The secondary schools are affiliated with either of the boards, the Council for the Indian School Certificate Examinations (CISCE), the Central Board for Secondary Education (CBSE), the National Institute of Open School (NIOS) or the Maharashtra State Board of Secondary and Higher Secondary Education. Under the 10+2+3 plan, after completing secondary school, students typically enroll for two years in a junior college, also known as pre-university, or in schools with a higher secondary facility affiliated with the Maharashtra State Board of Secondary and Higher Secondary Education or any central board. The taluka has 2 High schools, 23 Central Schools, 222 Primary Schools, 5 Ashram-run schools and 74 pre-school nurseries run by the Zila Parishad. Reputed schools in the taluka are Mahatma Gandhi Junior College of Science in the town of Manchar and Janta Vidya Mandir in Ghodegaon.

=== Vocational training ===
The town of Ghodegaon has a post Secondary School Industrial training institutes (ITI) run by the government that offer vocational training in numerous trades such as construction, plumbing, welding, automobile mechanics, etc. Successful candidates receive the National Trade Certificate.

=== Higher Education ===
Annasaheb Awate college run by the Rayat Shikshan Sanstha in Manchar is the institution that offers Degree and Masters level courses in the Taluka. Also The B.D. Kale college in Ghodegaon also Popular in Ambegaon. The college is affiliated to the Savitribai Phule Pune University. Institutes for Higher Technical Education in Ambegaon, are the Government Polytechnic College in Awasari, the Government College of Engineering & Research in Awasari Kd, and Dattatray Govindrao Walase Patil College for Higher Education run by the Bhimashankar Shikshan Sanstha in Pargaon (Shingave).

== Culture ==
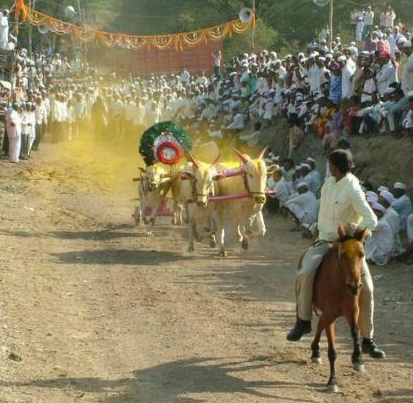
Bullock cart race at a festival in Manchar

Ganesh Utsav, Navratri, and many such auspicious festivals are also celebrated here with great enthusiasm. Janta Utsav is one of the unique festivals of this region where functions like yatra, wrestling, tamasha and numerous religious programmes are held by various Mandals. Bullock-cart races are an inseparable part of this taluka which is also very prominent throughout Maharashtra. Lots of tribe reside in Ambegaon they celebrate with their tradition and culture.

== Hindu Temples and places of pilgrimage in the region ==
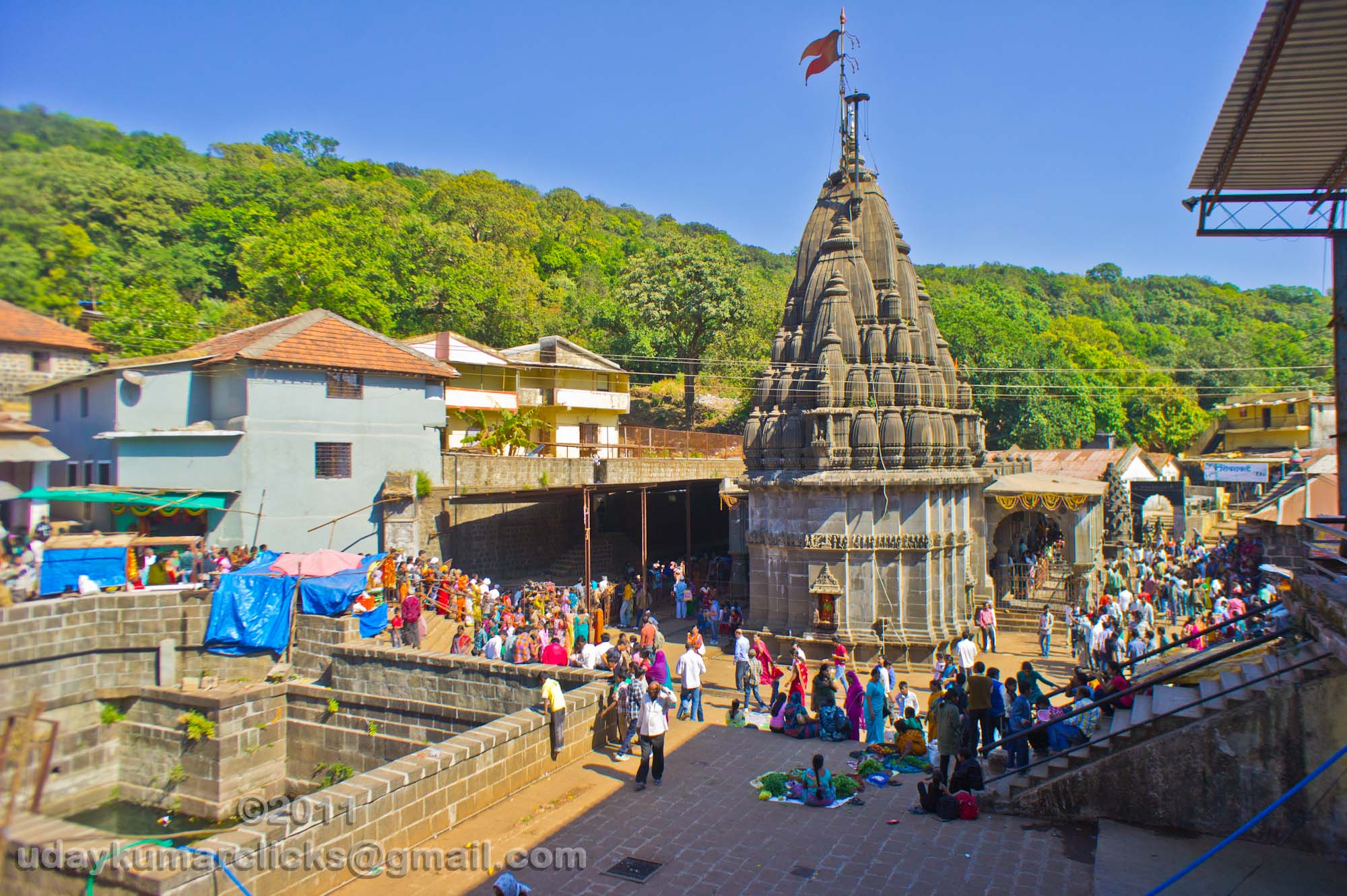
Bhimashankar Temple, one of the twelve holiest Jyotirlinga Temples

- Bhimashankar
- Kulswami Khanderaiya Mhalsakant Devasthan Dhamani
- Loni
- Dhamni
- Shirdale gaon
- Bhargarvrao Valti
- Narsingh Devalay
- Ram Mandir (Ranjani)
- Velleshawar Mahadev Devsthan (Kurwandi)
- Aaradhya Devat Shree Ram Mandir Pimplegaon (Khadki)
- Sant Dnyaneshwar Temple (Chas)
- Tapneshwar Mahadev (Manchar)
- Gorakshnath Mandir (Avsari Phata)
- Bhairavnath Devsthan (Avsari)
- Harishchandra Mandir Ghodegaon
- Ashtavinayak Ardhpeeth Vadgaon Kashimbeg
- Rameshwar Mahadev Pandavkalin Babruvahanhi Mandir Manipur (Manchar)
- Mahadev Dongar (Kadewadi, Chas)
- Ghodnadi Source, (Ahupe)
- Ranjan khalge and film shooting spot (Chas)
- Shamadhar Parvat Eklahare
- Kamaljadevi Mandir (Kalamb)
- Shree Vakeshwar Mandir (Peth)
- Sauranginath suvar parvat Bhavandi
- Kamaljadevi Shaktipeeth (Bhimashankar)
- Bhairavnath Mandir (Landewadi)
- Datta Mandir (Shinoli)
- Pach Pir (Vadgaon)
- Ram Mandir (Ambegaon Gavthan)
- Ahilyabai Holkar Fort (Vafgaon)
- Telecommunication Center, Narodi (Shiva mandir, Vishnu temple), Holkar Wada and Temple
- Jogeshwari Well commissioned by Ahilyabai Holkar (Khadki)
- Thapling (Shri Khanderaya Temple) (Nagapur)
- Shree Kulswami Khanderaya Temple (peth, Khandobamal)

== Places of Historical Importance and Recreation ==
- Dhimbhe Dam and Water power project.
- Peth Avasari Ghat. Huge walls and entry Gate of Holkars Period.

== See also ==
- Talukas in Pune district
- 2014 Malin landslide, which occurred in the village of Malin in Ambegaon taluka
- ambegaon.com
- https://web.archive.org/web/20150402165555/http://www.shinoli.com/
- http://www.ambegaon.com
