= Shivneri Fort =

Fort in Maharashtra, India

Shivneri fort
- Junnar, Pune District, Maharashtra
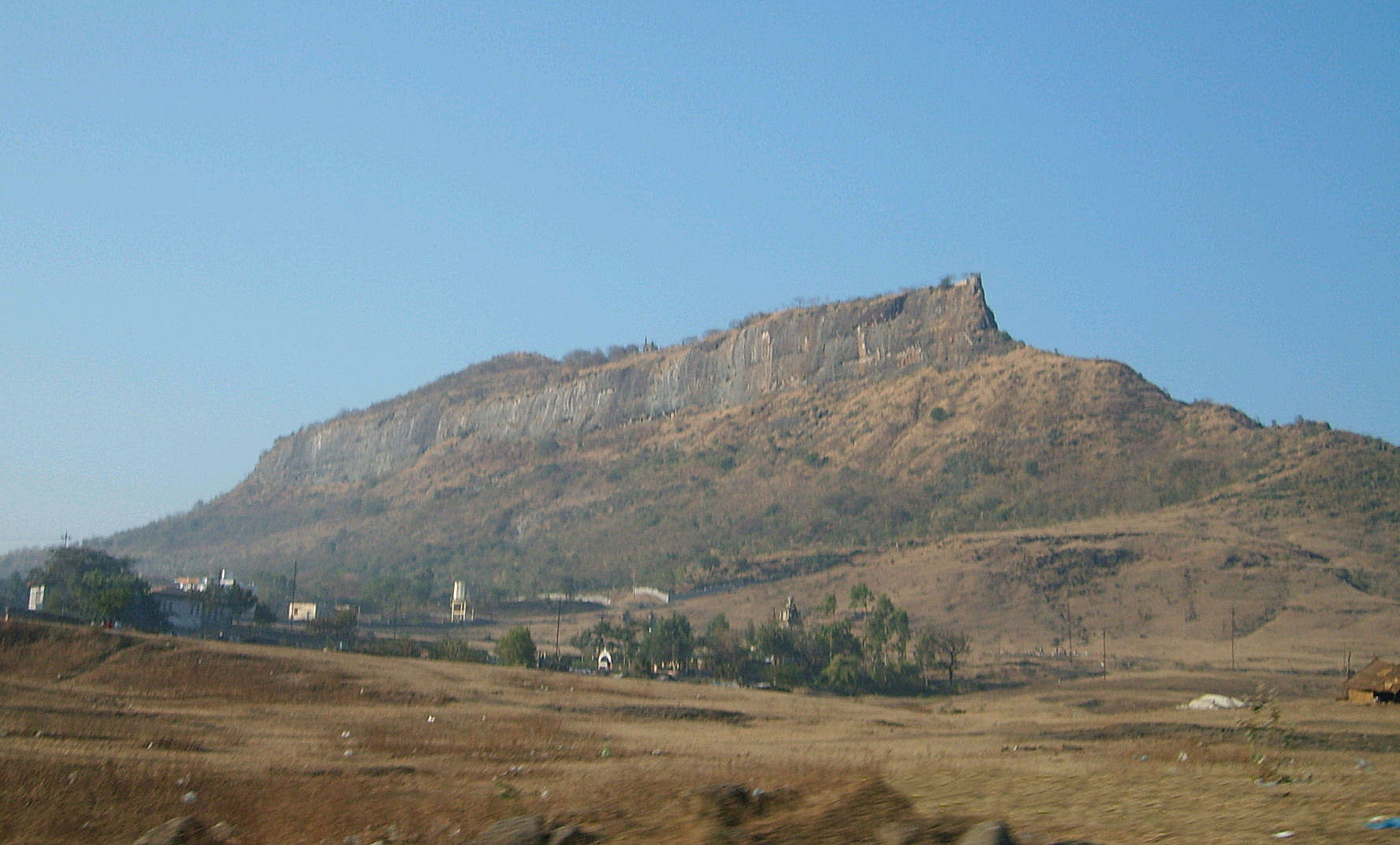

Site information
- Type: Fort
- Owner: Government of India
- Controlled by: Yadava dynasty Delhi Sultanate; Bahmani Sultanate; Ahmadnagar Sultanate; Maratha Kingdom; Mughal Empire; Company Raj (1820–1858); Indian Empire (1858–1947); Dominion of India (1947–1950); Republic of India (1950–present)
- Open to the public: Yes

Location
- Coordinates: 19.1990°N 73.8595°E

UNESCO World Heritage Site
- Part of: Maratha Military Landscapes of India
- Criteria: Cultural: iv, vi
- Reference: 1739-002
- Inscription: 2025 (47th Session)

Shivneri Fort (known as Killa) (Marathi pronunciation: [ʃiʋneɾiː]) is an ancient military fortification located near Junnar in Pune district in Maharashtra, India. It is the birthplace of Chatrapati Shivaji Maharaj, the founder of Maratha Kingdom.

== History ==
Shivneri got its name as it was under the possession of the Yadavas of Devagiri. This fort was mainly used to guard the old trading route from Desh to the port city of Kalyan. The place passed on to the Bahmani Sultanate after the weakening of Delhi Sultanate during the 15th century and it then passed on to the Ahmadnagar Sultanate in the 16th century. In 1595, a Maratha chief named Maloji Bhosale, the grandfather of Chhatrapati Shivaji Maharaj, was ennobled by the Ahmadnagar Sultan, Bahadur Nizam Shah and he gave him Shivneri and Chakan. Shivaji Maharaj was born at the fort on 19 February 1630, and spent his childhood there. Inside the fort is a small temple dedicated to goddess Shivai Devi (some accounts gives us information that the name Shivaji came from the name of the fort i.e. Shivneri), after whom Shivaji was named. The English traveller Fraze visited the fort in 1673 and found it invincible. According to his accounts, the fort was well-stocked to feed thousand families for seven years. The fort came under the control of the British rule in 1819 after the Third Anglo-Maratha War.

In 2021, it was added to the tentative list of the UNESCO World Heritage Committee as part of "Serial Nomination of Maratha Military Architecture in Maharashtra".

== Architecture ==
Shivneri Fort is a hill fort having a triangular shape and has its entrance from the South-west side of the hill. Apart from the main gate there is an entrance to the fort from side called locally as the chain gate, where in one has to hold chains to climb up to the fort gate. The fort extends up to 1 mile (1.6 km) with seven spiral well-defended gates. There are mud walls all around the fort. Inside the fort, the major buildings are the prayer hall, a tomb and a mosque. There is an overhanging where executions took place. There are many gates structures protecting this fort. Maha Darvaja is one of the many gates of the fort. Its also called the origin of Tune.

At the centre of the fort is a water pond which is called 'Badami Talav', and to the south of this pond are statues of Rajmata Jijabai and a young Shivaji raje. In the fort there are two water springs, called Ganga and Yamuna, which have water throughout the year. Two kilometers away from this fort there are the Buddhist rock-cut caves, called Lenyadri caves, which is also one of Ashtavinayak temple in Maharashtra. It has been declared as a protected monument.

== Access ==
The nearest town Junnar is a taluka place and is well connected by road. Junnar is about 90 km from Pune. The fort is at about 2–3 km from the junnar town. It is easy to reach the fort top via main entrance; however, the trekkers with proper climbing equipment can try the chain route which is located on the western scarp of the fort. From the top of the fort, Narayangad, Hadsar, Chavand and Nimgiri forts can easily be seen.

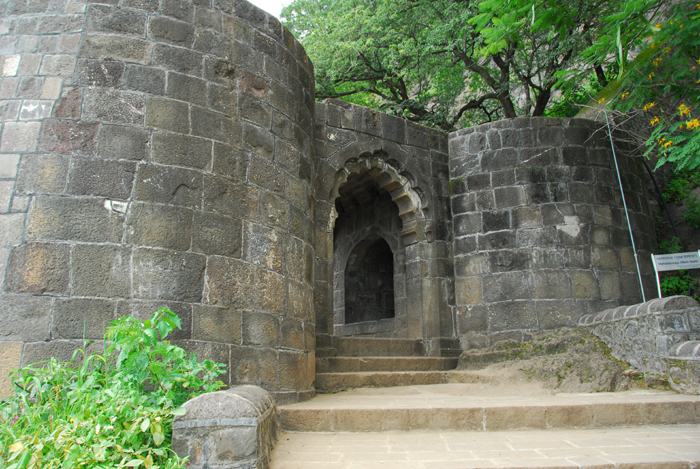
Entrance Gate

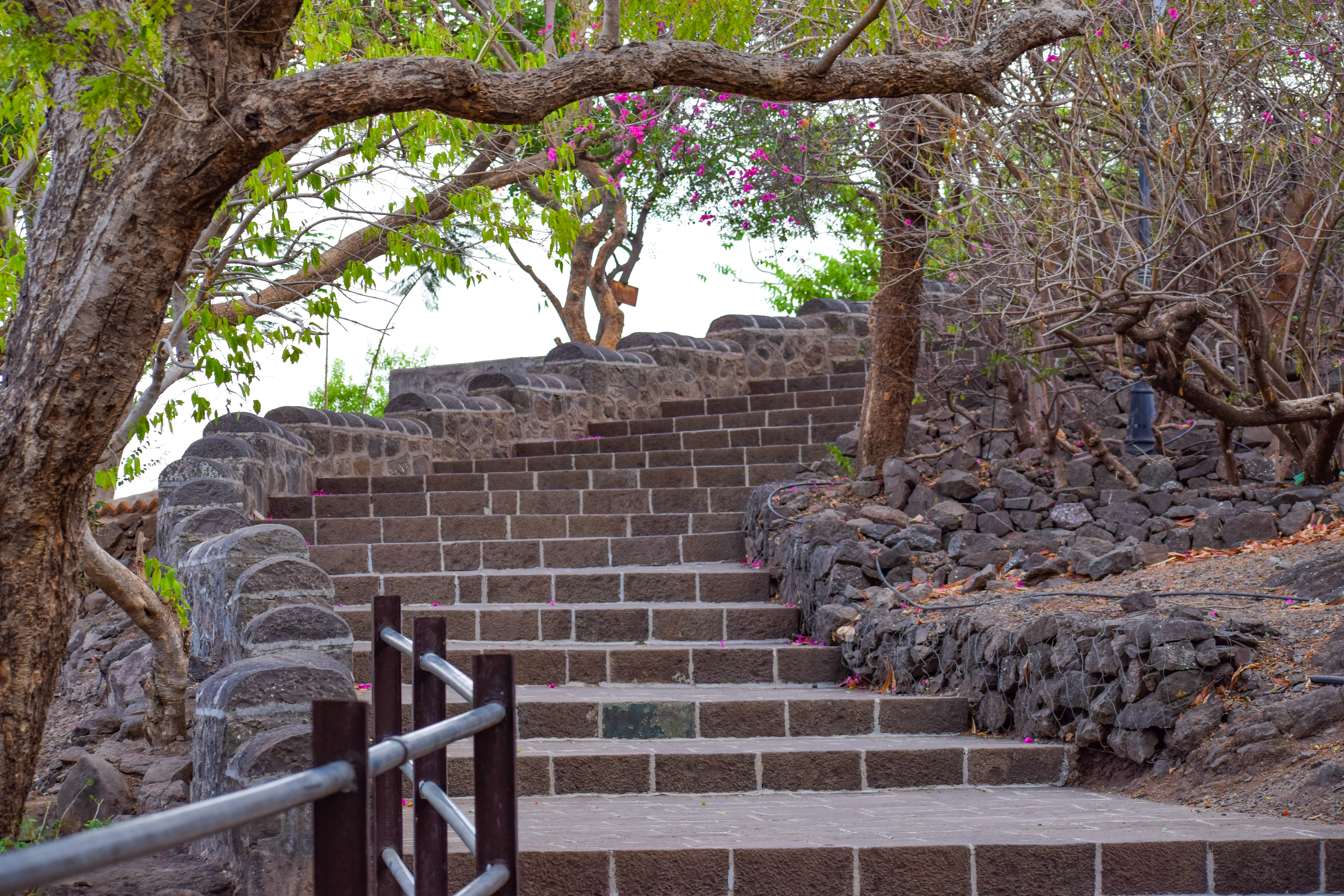
Stairs Leading to Shivneri Fort

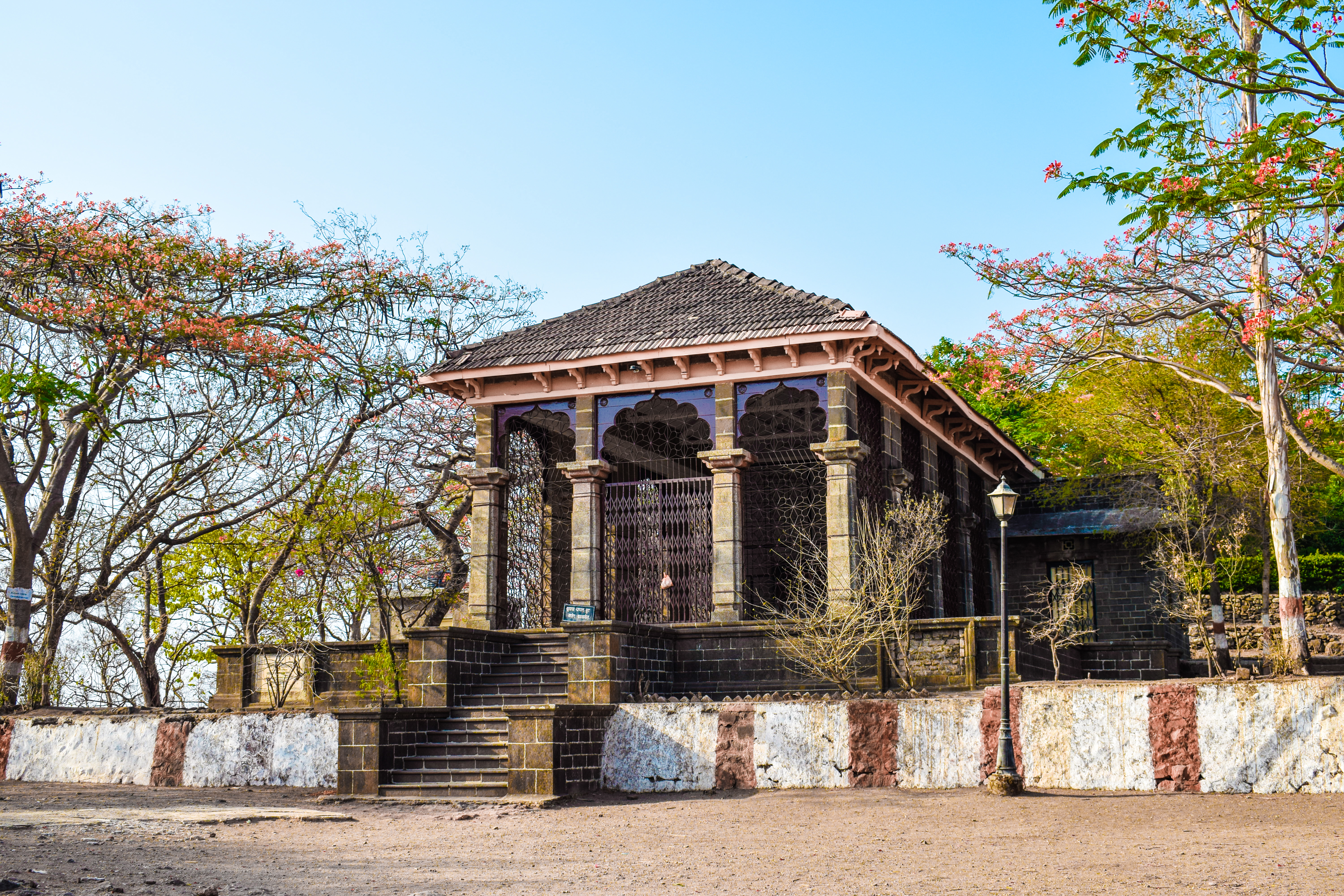
Mandir at Shivneri Fort

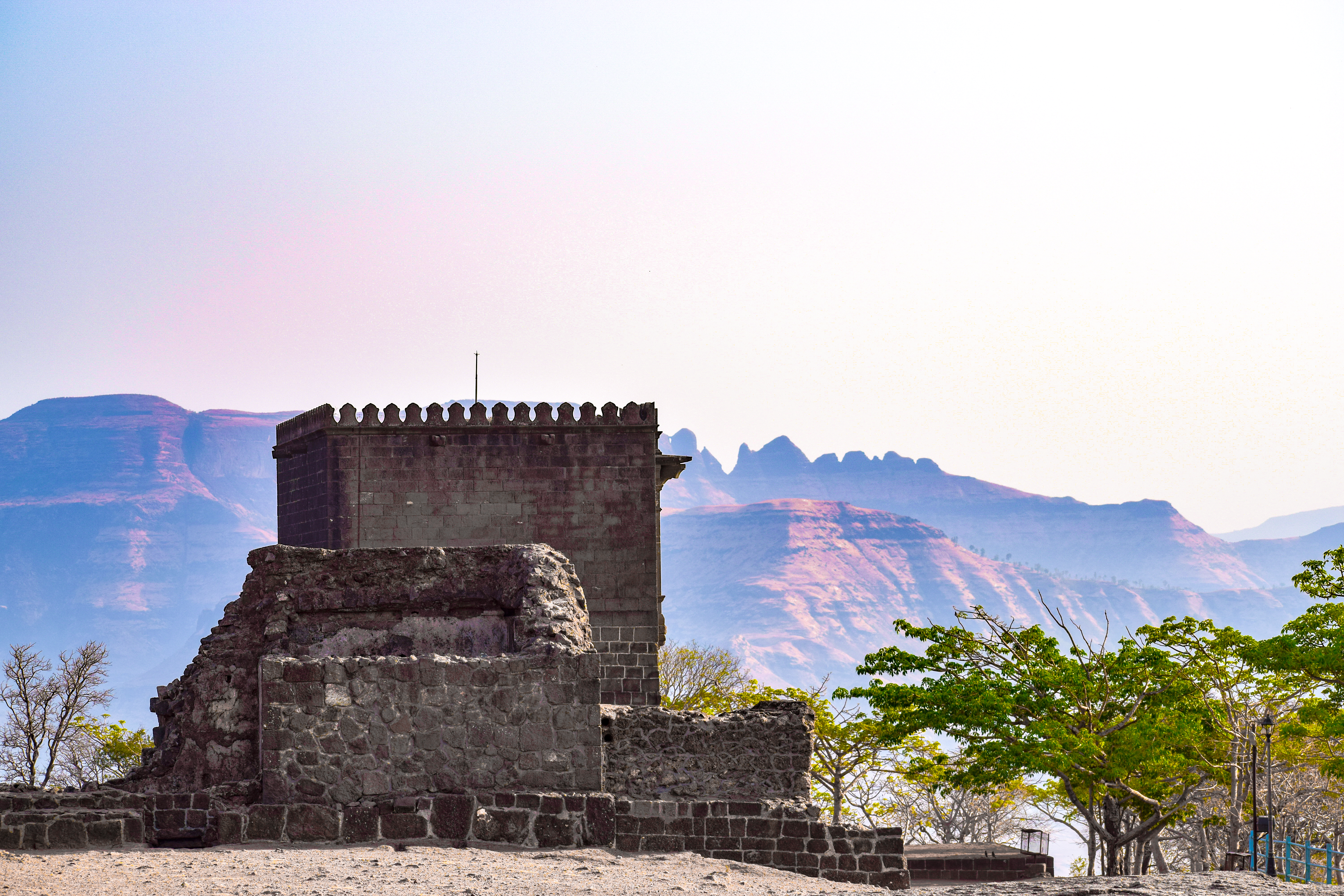
Sideview of Shivneri Fort

== See also ==
- List of forts in Maharashtra
