= Junnar =

- City
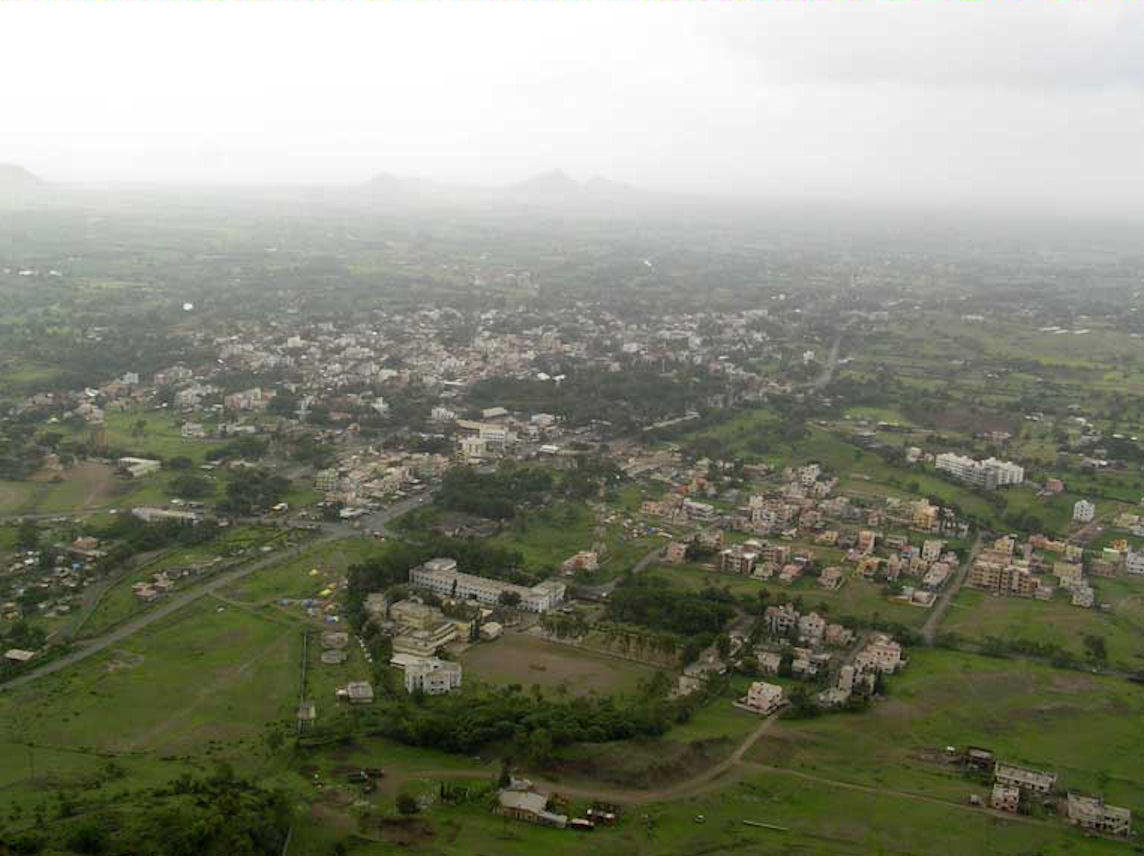
- Junnar city

- Location in Maharashtra, India Junnar (India)
- Coordinates: 19°12′26″N 73°52′27″E
- Country: India
- State: Maharashtra
- District: Pune
- Elevation: 689 m (2,260 ft)

Population (2011)
  - Total: 36,567

Languages
  - Official: Marathi
- Time zone: UTC+5:30 (IST)
- Postal code: 410502
- Website: Junnar Tourism Website

Junnar (Marathi: [d͡ʒunːəɾ]) is a city in the Pune district of the Indian state of Maharashtra. The city has history dating back to the first millennium. The nearby fort of Shivneri was the birthplace of Maratha king Chhatrapati Shivaji Maharaj, the founder of the Maratha Empire. Junnar was declared the first tourism taluka in Pune district by the government of Maharashtra on 9 January 2018.

== History ==
Junnar has been an important trading and political centre for the last two millennia. The town is on the trade route that links the ports of western India, more specifically of Konkan the Deccan interiors. The first mention of Junnar comes from Greco-Roman travellers in the first millennium, The Indo-Scythian Western Satraps ruled at Junnar during the 2nd century CE as shown by their cave inscriptions in the area of Junnar, at Manmodi Caves. "Yavana" Greeks also left donative inscriptions in the 2nd century CE at Lenyadri and Manmodi Caves. According to Damodar Kosambi, the real name of Junnar may have been Tagara. In his opinion, the name Junnar may be the contracted form of Jirnanagar (Old city).

In the 1400s, the Russian traveler Afanasy Nikitin spent two months in Junnar during the monsoon season. He describes vividly the life in the Bahamani-ruled area around Junnar. After the collapse of the Bahamanis, the breakaway state of Nizam Shahi had Junnar as their first capital in the 1490s. Later in early 1600s, Malik Ambar the Nizam Shahi general again moved his capital there. The father of Shivaji, Shahaji Raje Bhonsale worked for Malik Ambar early in his career. Shivaji was born at the nearby Shivneri fort.

== Geography ==
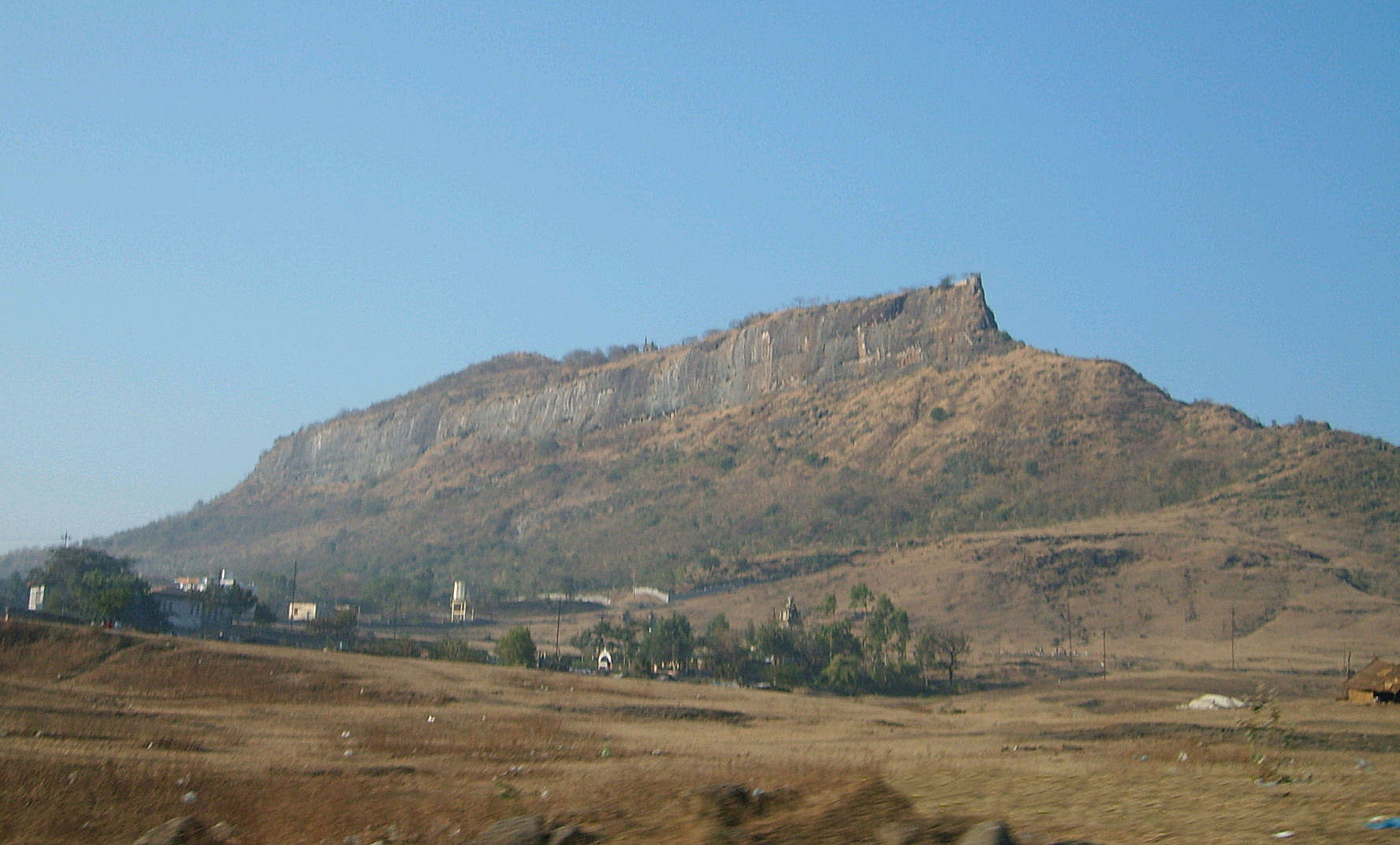
Shivneri hill, Junnar

Junnar has an average elevation of 689 metres (2,260 feet). The Kukadi River flows to the north.

=== Teak Forest ===
The Junnar area has been historically famed for its teak forest. The Shaniwar Wada, the de facto seat of government of the Maratha Empire in Pune was completed in 1732 by Peshwa Bajirao I.Teak from Junnar was used extensively in its construction.

== Demographics ==
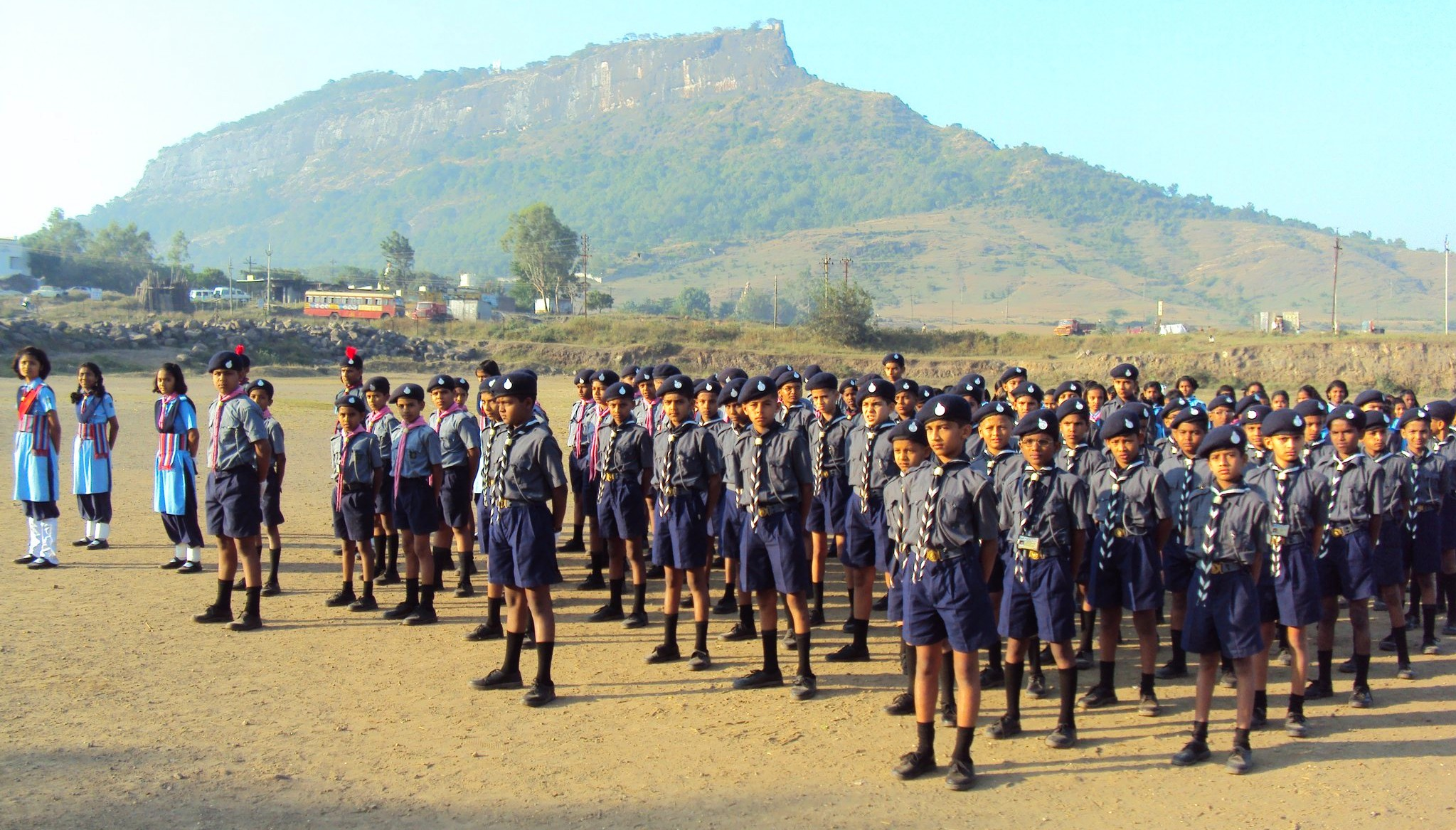
Scouts in Junnar.

As of 2001 India census, Junnar had a population of 24,740. Males constitute 52% of the population and females 48%. Junnar has an average literacy rate of 77%, higher than the national average of 59.5%: male literacy is 81%, and female literacy is 72%. In Junnar, 12% of the population is under 6 years of age.

== Transport ==
State Transport buses run between Pune and Junnar from Shivajinagar ST stand from 06:30 AM every hour. Also bus facility available from Mumbai (kalyan) for every 10–30 minutes from 05:20 AM till 12:30 AM. Same is the case from Ahmednagar and Nashik. Transportation from Ahmednagar and Mumbai takes the NH 222 route, while from Pune and Nashik it takes the NH 50 route.

== Junnar Tourism ==
Junnar is dotted with historic sites including Shivneri, the birthplace of the Maratha king Chhatrapati Shivaji Maharaj; the cave temple at Lenyadri; the Kulswami Khandoba temple in Wadaj; Ozar, one of Lord Ganesha's famous temples; and the walled town of Junnar itself. In addition to this, Junnar possesses a historical underground water chain located at Sayyed Wada (Nehr e Hussaini hauz) Junnar in the remembrance of Karbala. This water reservoir still exists today.

=== Shivneri Fort ===
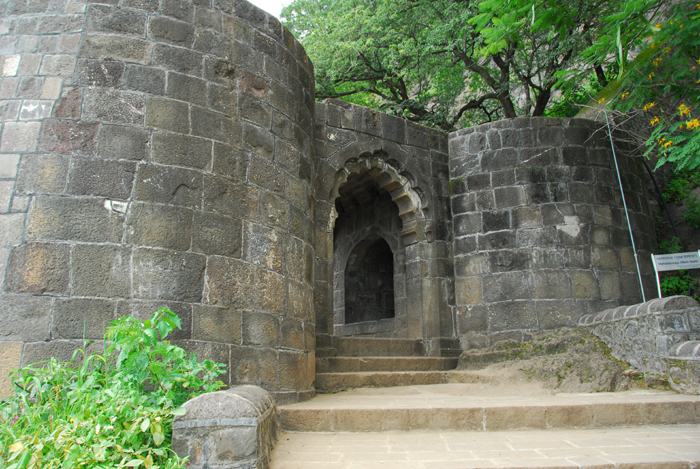
Entrance to Shivneri fort.

Shivneri, the birthplace of Chhatrapati Shivaji Maharaj

=== Jivdhan Fort ===
Jivdhan, Jivdhan (or Jeevdhan) is a hill fortress situated 1 km near the modern day town of Ghatghar in Junnar Taluka of Pune district in Maharashtra, India.

=== Hadsar Fort ===
The Hadsar fort is among the many forts in Junnar region of Pune district that were built to protect the ancient commercial trade route from the Mawal region to Kalyan via Naneghat. It features a marvelous sculpture design of the bastion and the fort entrance which is not seen elsewhere, as they are all carved from a single rock.

=== Cave temples ===
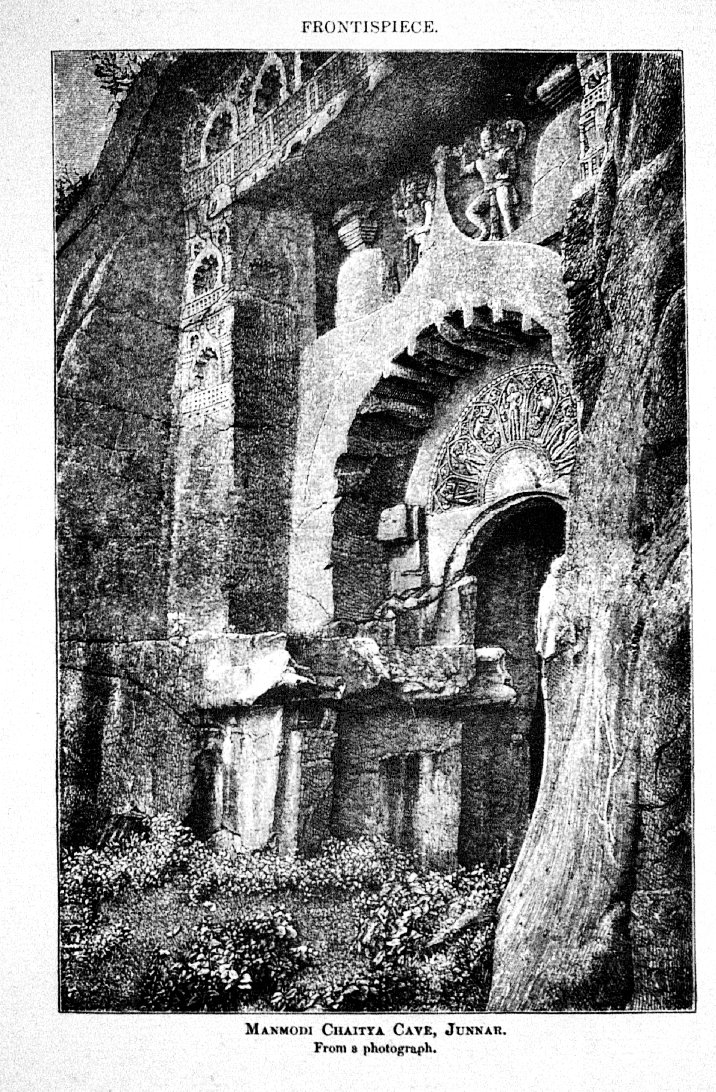
Manmodi Caves Chaitya. Woodcut from Photograph, 1880.

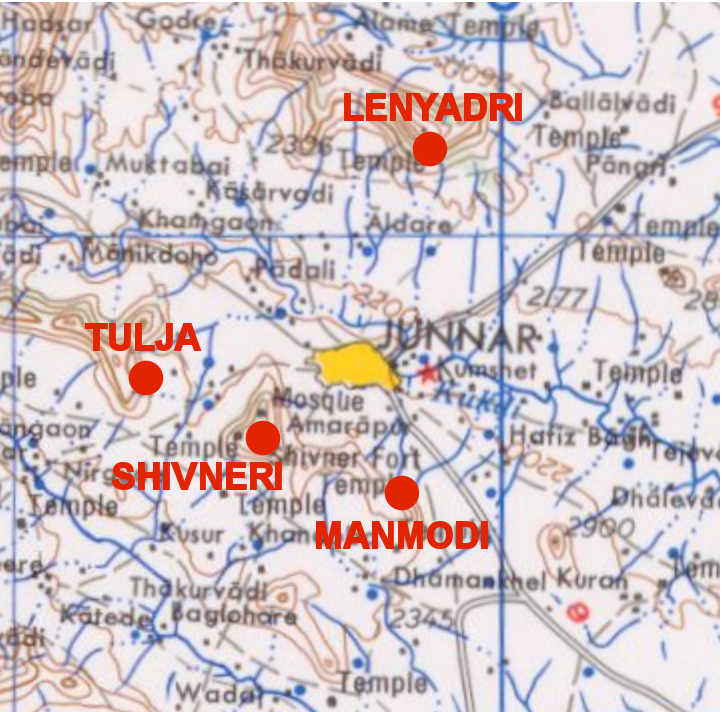
Location of Buddhist caves around the city of Junnar.

Surroundings of Junnar are very rich with ancient cave temples. In total there are more than 220 individual rock-cut caves located in four hills around Junnar. Junnar has the largest and longest cave excavations in India. The most famous among the caves is the Lenyadri complex. It represents a series of about 30 rock-cut mostly Buddhist caves. Cave 7 is a famous Hindu temple dedicated to the god Ganesha. It is one of the Ashtavinayak shrines, a set of the eight prominent Ganesha shrines in Maharashtra. Twenty-six of the caves are individually numbered. The caves face to the south and are numbered serially from east to west. Caves 6 and 14 are chaitya-grihas (chapels), while the rest are viharas (dwellings for monks). The latter are in the form of dwellings and cells. There are also several rock-cut water cisterns; two of them have inscriptions. The layout of the caves, in general, are similar in pattern and shape. They generally have one or two sides with two long benches for occupants' use. The caves date from between the 1st and 3rd century AD; the Ganesha shrine situated in Cave 7 is dated to the 1st century AD, though the date of conversion to a Hindu shrine is unknown. All of the caves arise from Hinayana Buddhism.

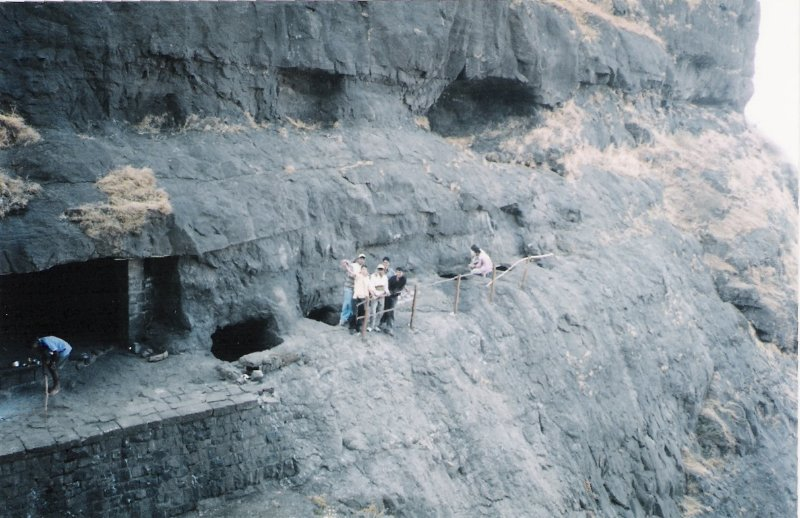
Naneghat caves near Junnar

The caves of Junnar are grouped according to the following classification:

- Tulja Leni or Tuljalena, on the Tuljabai hill, 4 km west of Junnar.
- Shivneri group or Sivaneri group, 3 km southwest of Junnar.

- East facing group (1, 2, and 3)
- West facing group
- South facing group

- Manmodi group, on Manmodi hill, 3 km south of Junnar.

- Bhimasankar group
- Amba-Ambika group
- Bhutalinga group

- Lenyadri or Ganesh lena group, 5 km north of Junnar.

About 20 km to the northwest of Junnar, the Naneghat caves can also be seen.

=== Saudagar Gumbaz ===
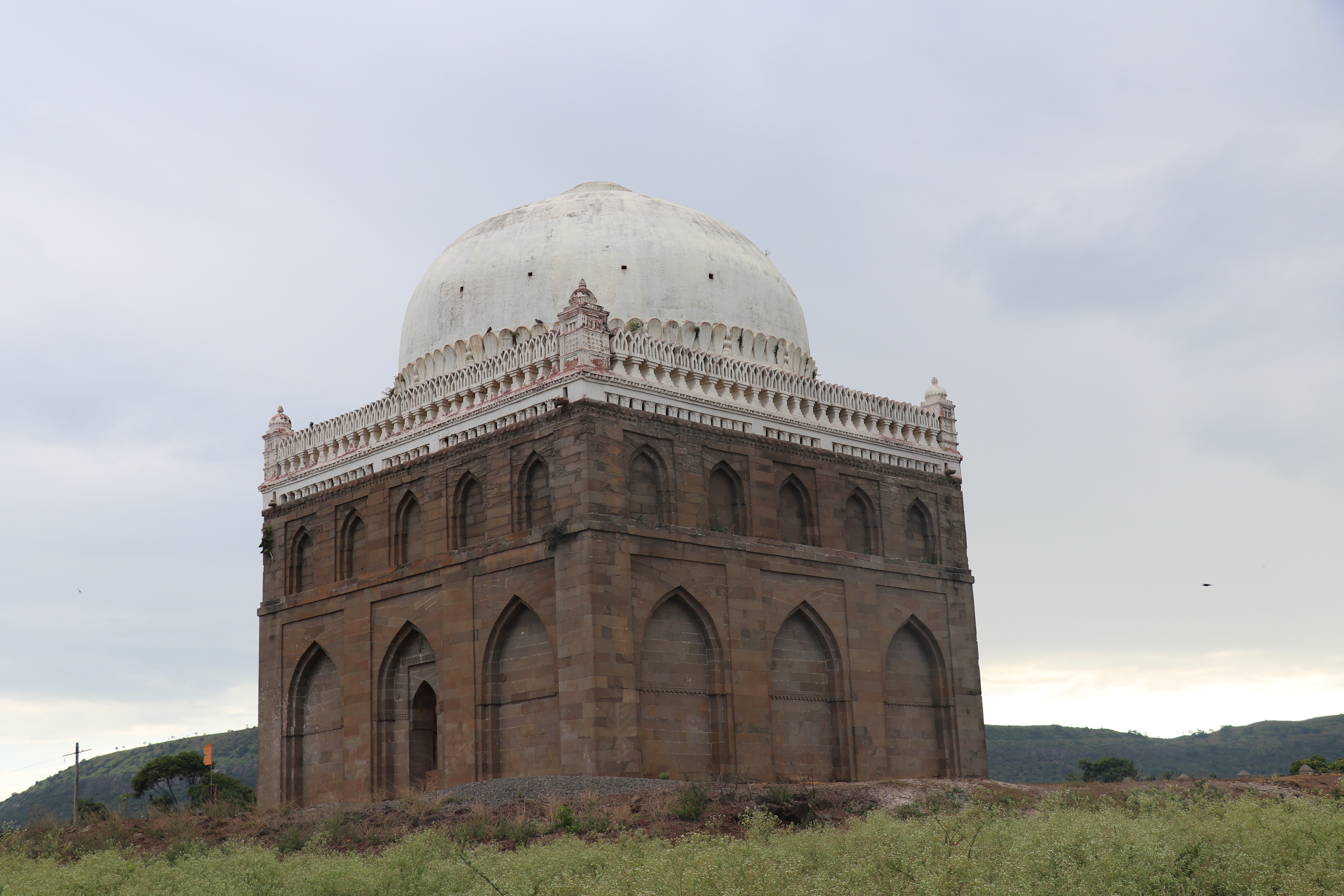
Saudagar Gumbaz

The monument is located in Hapusbaug village, 10 km away from Junnar. It was built in the 17th century, and is considered the finest building from the islamic era of the town. The tombs has a double-storied facade with a single large space.It is an example of an early post-Bahmani type architecture. It is on the List of Monuments of National Importance in Maharashtra.

=== Yavana Inscriptions ===
Several inscriptions related to donations by Yavanas (Indo-Greeks) have been found at the Junnar caves. These inscriptions are located in the Shivneri Caves:

- One inscription mentions the gift of two cisterns to the monks by a Yavana donor named Irila.
- Another inscription mentions the gift of a dining hall to the samgha by a Yavana donor named Chita.

At Manmodi Caves, another Yavana donor named Chanda dedicated a hall front to the Samgha.

Similar donations by Yavanas can be found at the Nasik Caves and the Great Chaitya of the Karla Caves.

=== Agritourism ===
Agritourism or agrotourism, as it is defined most broadly, involves any agriculturally based operation or activity that brings visitors to a farm or ranch. Few popular such venture, "Parashar Agri & Village Tourism centre", is situated in village Rajuri of Junnar Taluka, and other Rashmigreenland Agri Tourism Center, located at the foothills of Leynadri temple, Golegaon, Junnar. Furthermore, tourists in Junnar can partake in treks and tours along the countryside.

== Leopards ==
There have been numerous cases of leopards attacking people and livestock in Junnar in recent years with many fatalities. According to field studies carried out in Junnar, the man-leopard crisis has been brought about not only by development, but by the recent translocations of the leopards. The problem is most acute in areas bordering the Junnar Forest Division where sugarcane plantations provide a good hiding place for leopards. There is a leopard rescue centre located at Manikdoh for this cause.

== See also ==
- Rama Kirve
