= Lenyadri =

Buddhist caves in Junnar, India

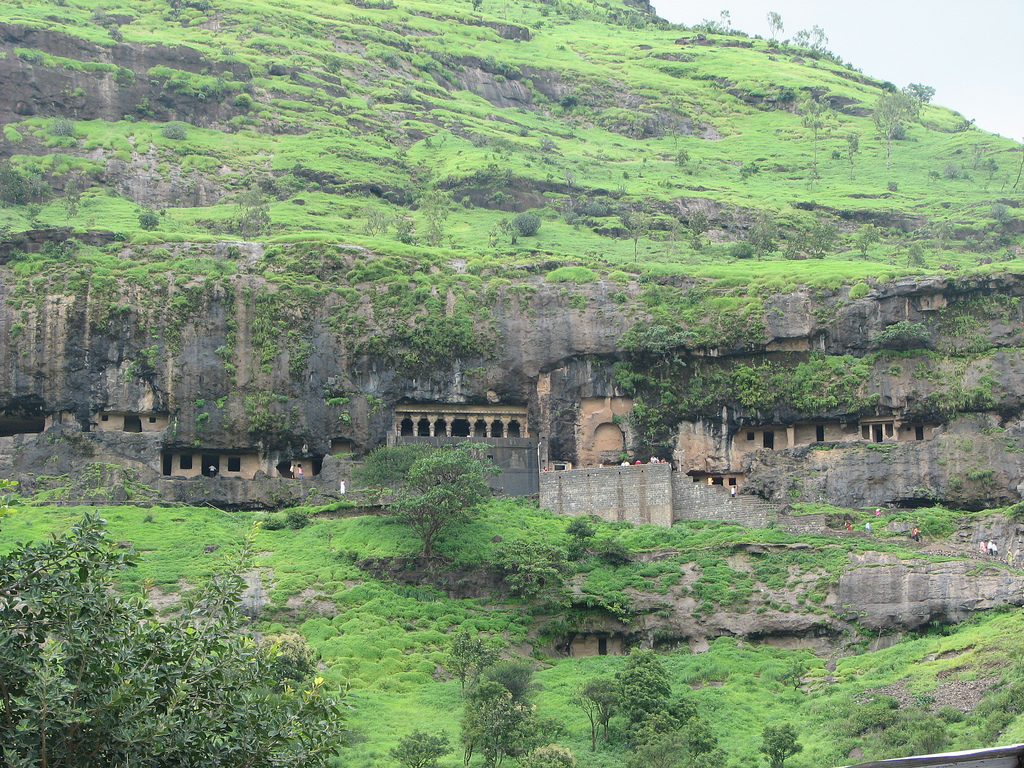
- Lenyadri complex

- Location within India
- Location: Junnar, Maharashtra, India
- Coordinates: 19°14′34″N 73°53′8″E

Lenyadri, sometimes called Ganesa Lena, Ganesh Pahar Caves, are a series of about 30 rock-cut Buddhist "caves", located about 4.8 kilometres (3.0 mi) north of Junnar in Pune district in the Indian state of Maharashtra. They are cut into a natural cliff or steep slope. Other caves surrounding the city of Junnar are: Manmodi Caves, Shivneri Caves and Tulja Caves. The Lenyadri caves date between the 1st and 3rd century AD. Some have later been adapted to Hindu use.

Twenty-six of the caves are individually numbered. The caves face to the south and are numbered serially from east to west. Caves 6 and 14 are chaitya-grihas (chapels), while the rest are viharas (dwellings for monks). The latter are in the form of dwellings and cells. There are also several rock-cut water cisterns; two of them have inscriptions. The layout of the caves, in general, are similar in pattern and shape. They generally have one or two sides with two long benches for occupants' use.

Two of the central cells of Cave 7 – originally a Buddhist vihara – were at an unknown later date appropriated for the worship of the Hindu god Ganesha. The rest of the cells and the hall of Cave 7 remain in their original form. This Ganesha Lena vihara is one of the Ashtavinayak shrines, a set of the eight prominent Ganesha shrines in Western Maharashtra. In regional mythology, this is the Girijatmaja cave where goddess Parvati desired to be a mother and where Ganesha was born.

== Names ==
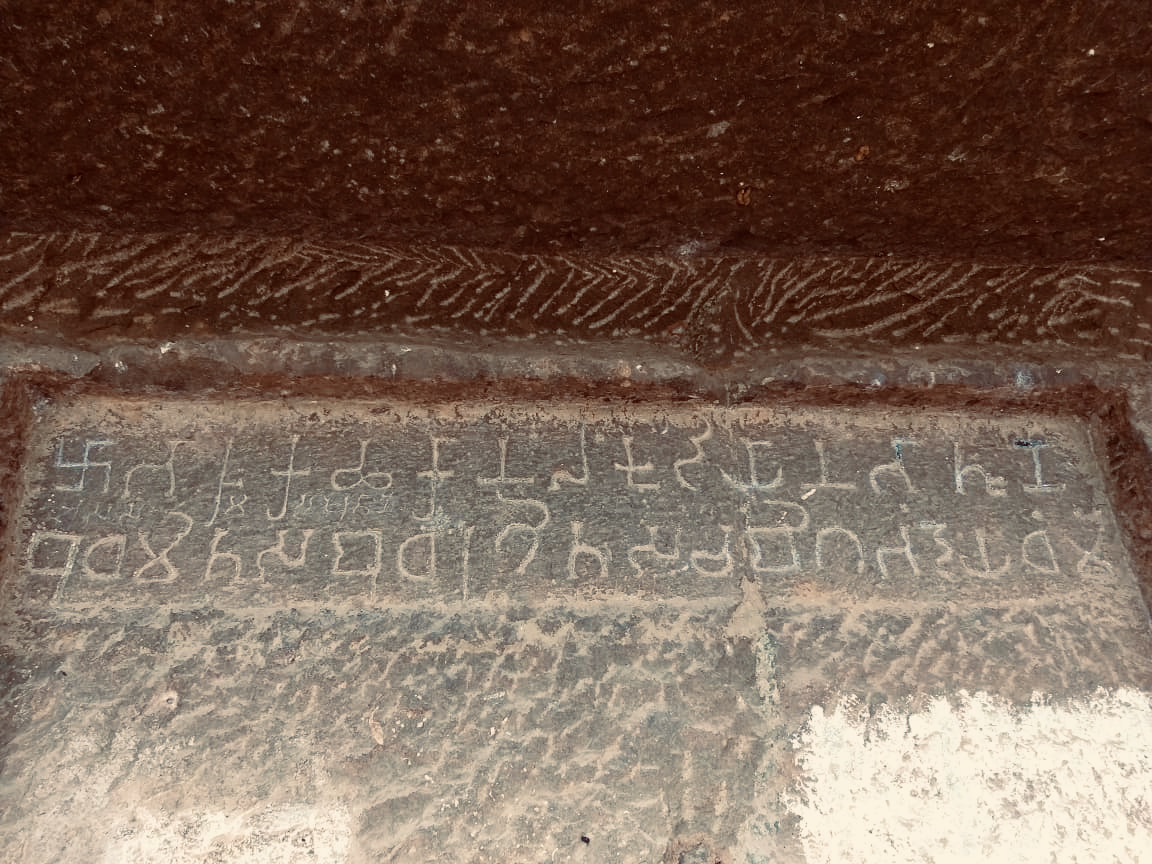
Lenyadri cave inscriptions

The current name "Lenyadri" literally means "mountain cave". It is derived from 'Lena' in Marathi meaning "cave" and 'adri' in Sanskrit meaning "mountain" or "stone". The name "Lenyadri" appears in the Hindu scripture Ganesha Purana as well as in a Sthala Purana, in association to the Ganesha legend. It is also called Jeernapur and Lekhan parvat ("Lekhan mountain").

The hill was once known as Ganesh Pahar ("Ganesha hill"). An ancient inscription calls the place Kapichita (Kapichitta). The caves are also known as Ganesh Lena or Ganesh Caves.

== Geography ==
Lenyadri is located at 19°14′34″N 73°53′8″E, in the Indian state of Maharashtra in Pune district. Lenyadri is a deserted location, with no human settlement nearby. It is located at about 4.8 kilometres (3.0 mi) from Junnar, the headquarters of Junnar taluka. It is situated on the north-west banks of river Kukadi, which flows between Golegaon and Junnar. It is also approached through Nanaghat, which was originally on the trade route between Aparantaka or the northern Konkan and the Deccan and descending to the plains of the Junnar town. The circular hill, where Lenyadri caves have been emboweled, raises about 30 metres (98 ft) above the plains in the Hatkeshwar and Suleiman ranges.

Lenyadri is the only Ashtavinayaka temple on a mountain and within the precincts of Buddhist caves.

== Cave 7: Ganesha Temple ==
Lenyadri Ganesha Temple (Shri Girijatmaja Temple)
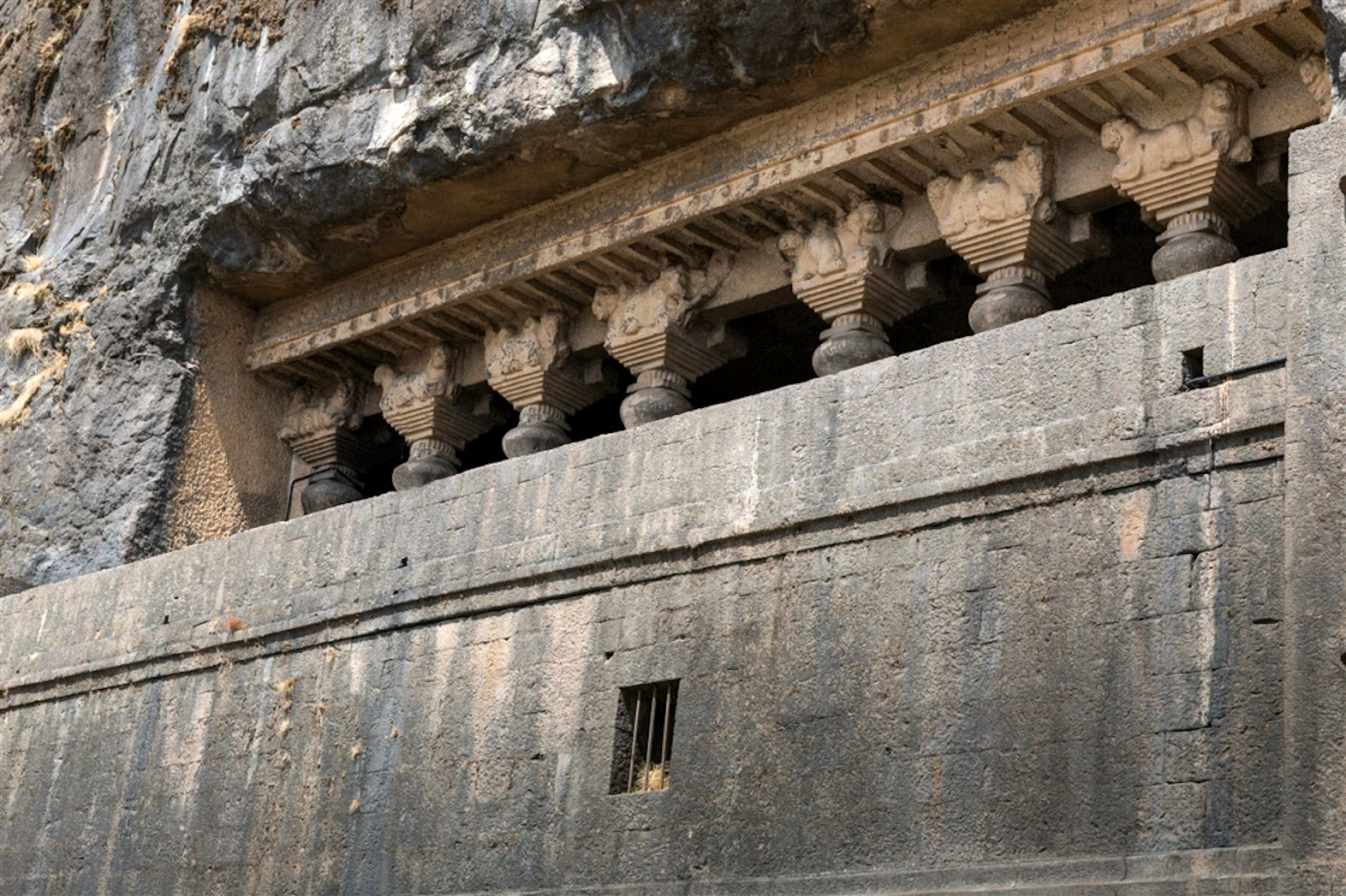
- Lenyadri, cave 7

Religion
- Affiliation: Hinduism
- District: Pune District
- Deity: Ganesha as Girijatmaja
- Festivals: Ganesh Chaturthi and Ganesh Jayanti

Location
- Location: Lenyadri caves near Junnar
- State: Maharashtra
- Country: India
- Interactive map of Lenyadri Ganesha Temple (Shri Girijatmaja Temple)

Architecture
- Type: Buddhist vihara cave
- Completed: the vihara dates to the 1st century AD, date of conversion to temple: unknown

=== Architecture ===
The Ganesha temple is located in Cave 7, the largest excavation around Junnar, about 30 metres (98 ft) above the plains. It is essentially a Buddhist Vihara (a dwelling for monks, mostly with meditation cells) in design, an unpillared hall with 20 cells with varying dimensions; 7 on either side and 6 on the rear wall. The hall is large, can be entered by a central door, under a pillared veranda. The hall is 17.37 metres (57.0 ft) long; 15.54 metres (51.0 ft) wide and 3.38 metres (11.1 ft) high. There are 2 windows on either side of the entrance. The hall is treated now as a sabha-mandapa ("assembly hall") of the Ganesha temple. 283 steps built (by devotees) in stone masonry over eight flights lead to the entrance. The steps are believed to represent sensual pleasures, which Ganesha has overcome. The veranda has six pillars and two pilasters (half-pillars), that support "an architrave from which projects eaves relieved with a railing resting on beams and rafters". The pillars have octagonal shafts and "over benches and back rest and topped by an inverted ghata, compressed amalaka in between two square plates, inverted stepped pyramid and finally crowned by a bracket" with tigers, elephants and bulls.

In a later period, the two central cells of the rear wall have been combined by breaking the partition in between to house the Ganesha image. The old entrance was also widened during the conversion to the Ganesha temple. There are two other smaller entrances to the hall. All entrances bear marks of sockets for fixing wooden doors, added during the conversion, and still have doors. The hall also has traces of plaster and paintings, both added during the conversion and renewed in later times - possibly as late as the 19th century. The Gazetteer of the Bombay Presidency (1882) records that the hall was plastered and white-washed. The paintings depicted Ganesha's childhood, marriage preparations, battle with demons and so forth, along with scenes of other Hindu deities like Devi, Krishna, Vishnu and Shiva.

Icon

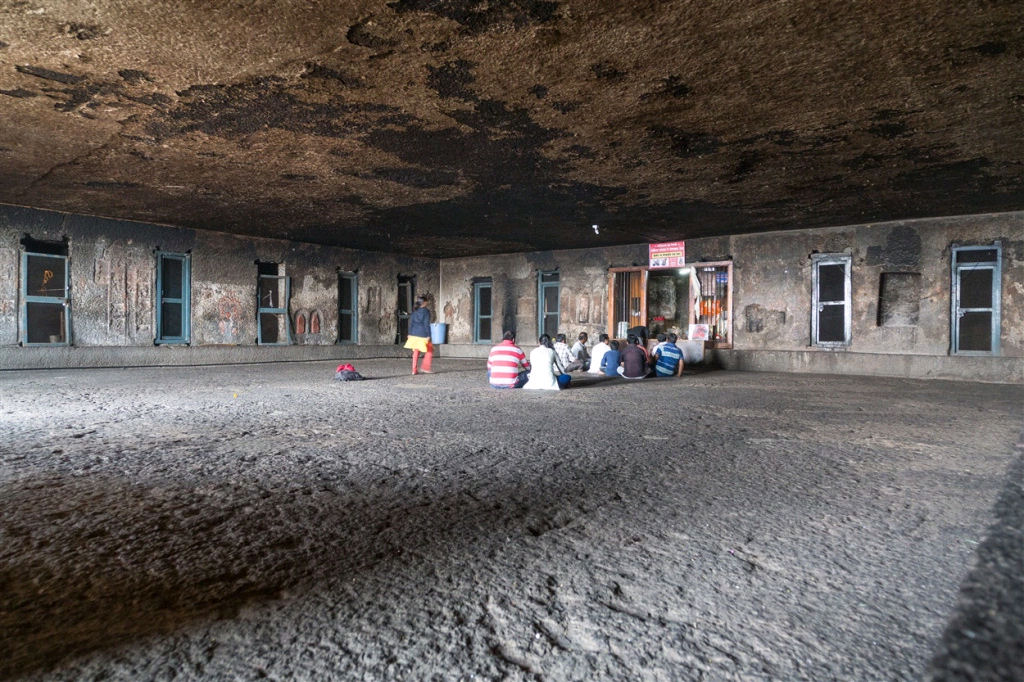
Inside of cave No.7, two central cells form the Ganesha shrine

The Ganesha form worshipped here is called Girijatmaja (Sanskrit: गिरिजात्मज). The name is either interpreted as "mountain-born" or as "Atmaja of Girija", the son of Parvati, who herself is daughter of the mountain Himavan, a personification of the mountains of Himalayas. The features of the Ganesha icon, seen on the back wall of the cave, are the least distinct vis-a-vis the other Ashtavinayak temples. Though the temple faces the inauspicious south, - according to a local tradition - the deity faces north, with his back to his worshipper and his face visible on the other side of the mountain. The Peshwa rulers even tried in vain to locate the face of Ganesha on the other side. The central icon was covered with brass-plated wooden armour, given as a gift by Junnar. The armour is not present currently. After it was removed, Ganesha could be seen with his trunk turned to the left side, facing east, with one of his eyes visible. The icon is covered with sindoor and is directly formed/sculpted on the stone wall of the cave.

Like all Ashtavinayaka temples, the central Ganesha image is believed to be svayambhu (self-existent), a naturally occurring stone formation resembling an elephant-face.

=== Legend ===
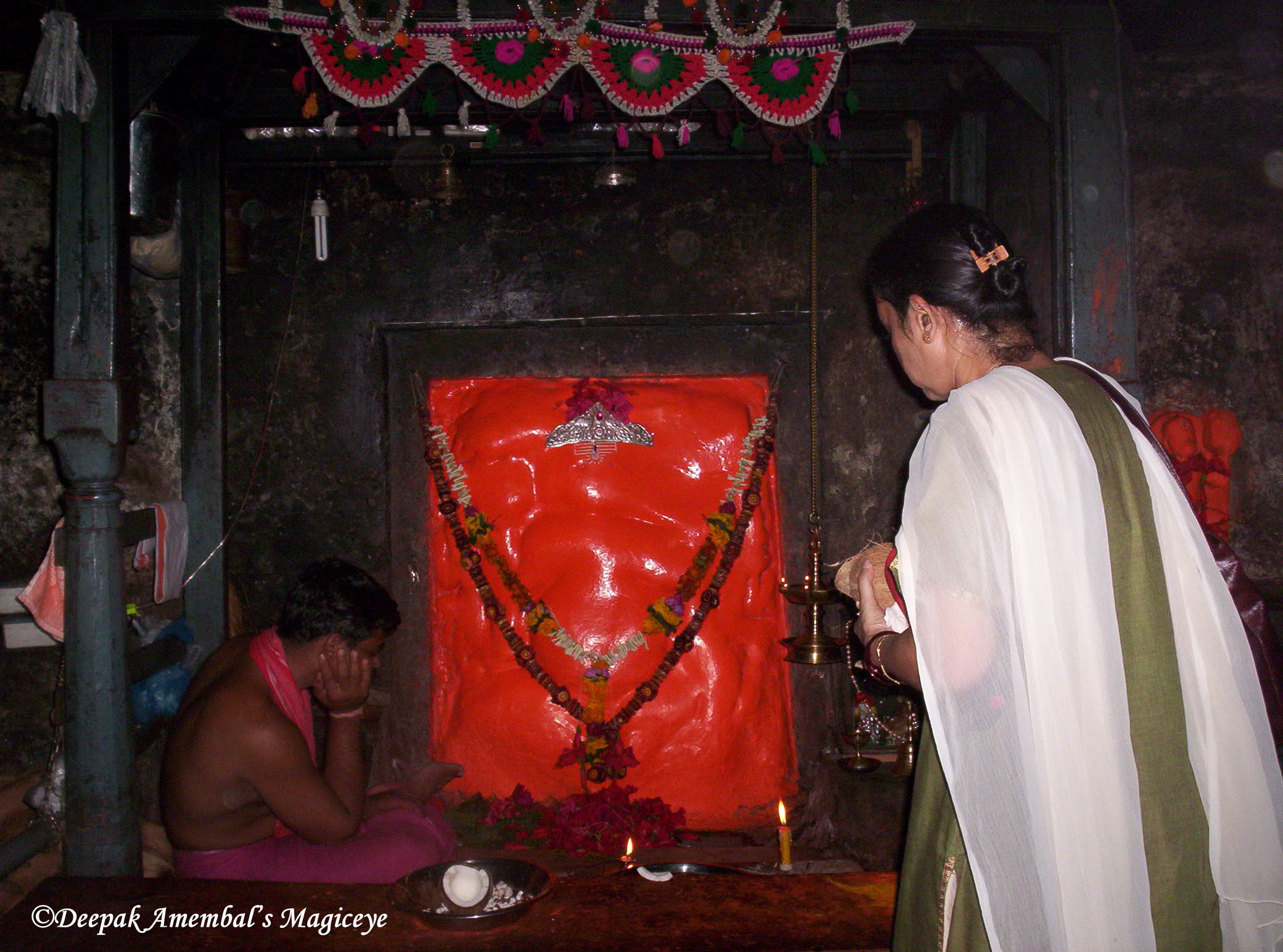
The sanctum and central icon

According to the Ganapatya scripture Ganesha Purana, Ganesha incarnated as Mayuresvara or Mayureshwar (Mayūreśvara), who had six arms and a white complexion. His mount was a peacock. He was born to Shiva and Parvati in the Treta Yuga, for the purpose of killing the demon Sindhu.

Once Parvati (Girija) asked her husband Shiva who he was meditating on. He said he was meditating on "the supporter of the entire universe" - Ganesha, and initiated Parvati with the Ganesha Mantra "Gam". Desiring to have a son, Parvati underwent austerities meditating on Ganesha, for twelve years at Lenyadri. Pleased by her penance, Ganesha blessed her with the boon that he will be born as her son. Accordingly, on the fourth lunar day of the bright fortnight of the Hindu month Bhadrapada (Ganesh chaturthi day), Parvati worshipped a clay image of Ganesha, which came alive. Thus, Ganesha was born to Parvati at Lenyadri. Later, he was named Gunesha by Shiva. Shiva gave him a boon that whosoever remembers him before starting a job, will successfully complete that task. For 15 years Gunesha grew up at Lenyadri. Sindhu, who knew that his death would be at the hands of Gunesha, sent demons like Krur, Balasur, Vyomasur, Kshemma, Kushal, and many more, to kill Gunesha, but all of them were instead killed by him. At the age of six, the architect-god Vishwakarma worshipped Gunesha and endowed him with the weapons Pasha (noose), Parashu (axe), Ankusha (hook) and Padma (Lotus). Once, little Gunesha knocked an egg from a mango tree, from which emerged a peacock. Gunesha mounted the peacock and assumed the name Mayuresvara. Mayuresvara later killed Sindhu and his army-generals at Morgaon, the most important Ashtavinayaka temple.

=== Worship ===
Lenyadri is one of the eight revered Ganesha temples collectively called Ashtavinayaka. The caves including the temple lie under the control of the Archaeological Survey of India. Sardar Deshpande is the priest in charge of the temple's activities. He does not stay in Lenyadri. The priests are Yajurvedi Brahmins. The festivals of Ganesh Jayanti and Ganesh Chaturthi are celebrated in the temple, when pilgrims crowd all Ashtavinayak temples.

== Chaityas (chapels) ==
Cave 6

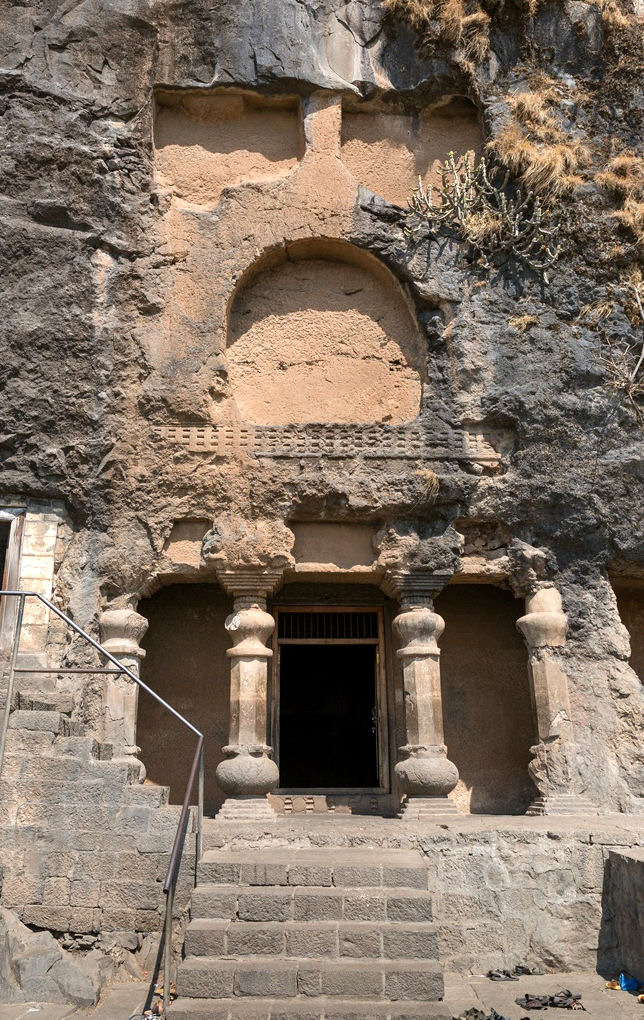
Front of Cave 6, the main Chaitya.

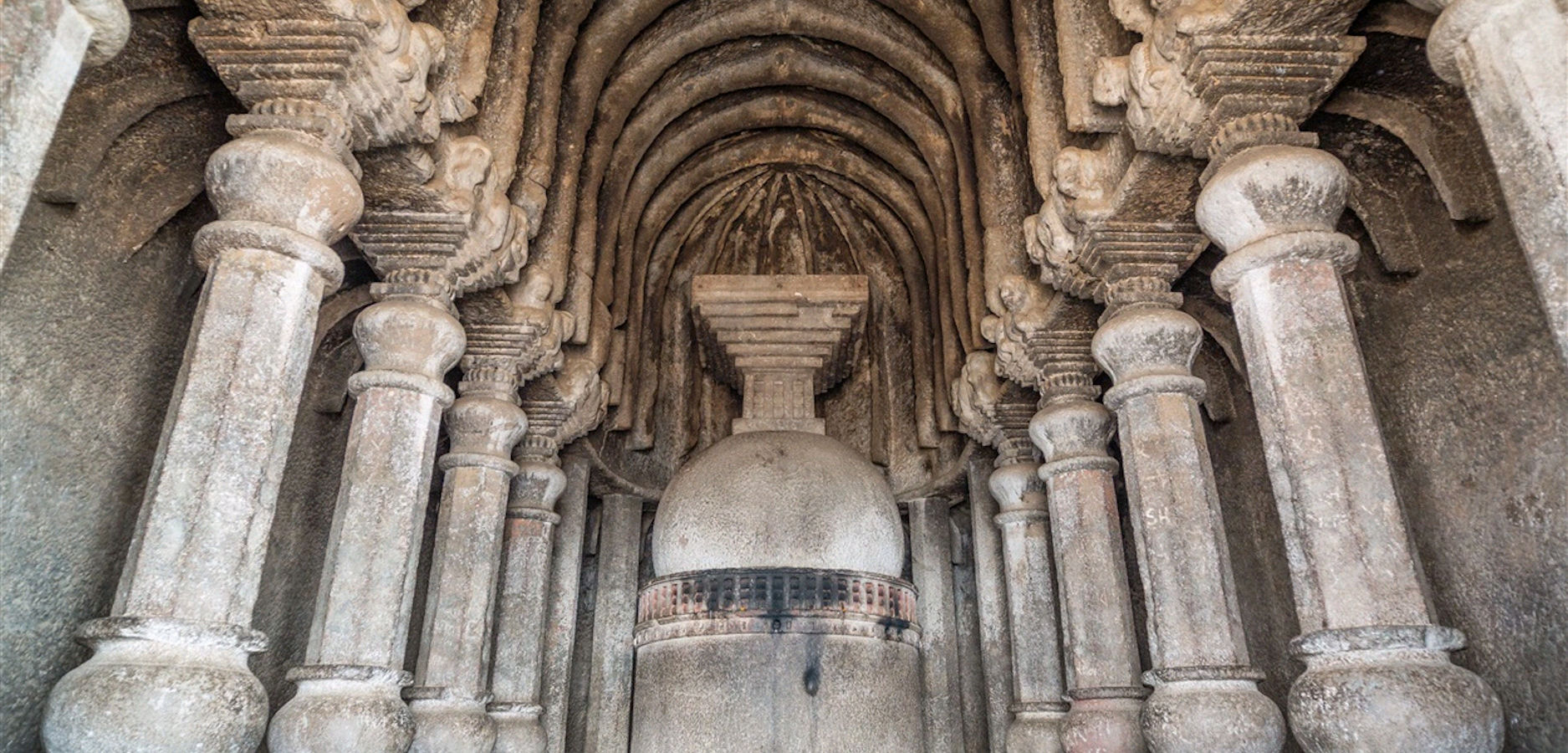
Lenyadri Chaitya hall, cave No.6

Cave 6 is the main chaitya-griha of the Lenyadri caves and one of the earliest examples of a Hinayana chaitya-griha. Its plan is similar to the Ajanta Caves chaitya-griha, though smaller in size. It has a veranda, pillars and pilasters with animal-capitals, and a shrine with 5 steps at the entrance. The shrine hall is entered by a plain and a socketed-door measuring 1.8 metres (5.9 ft) in width and 2.79 metres (9.2 ft) in height. The hall measures 13.3 metres (44 ft) in length; 6.7 metres (22 ft) in width and 7 metres (23 ft) in height. It has a row of five pillars and one pilaster on each side of the chaitya or Dagoba or stupa (central relic-shrine), located at the rear of the hall. A start was made on a typical large arched window above the entrance, but this was never completed, and remains a blind recess.

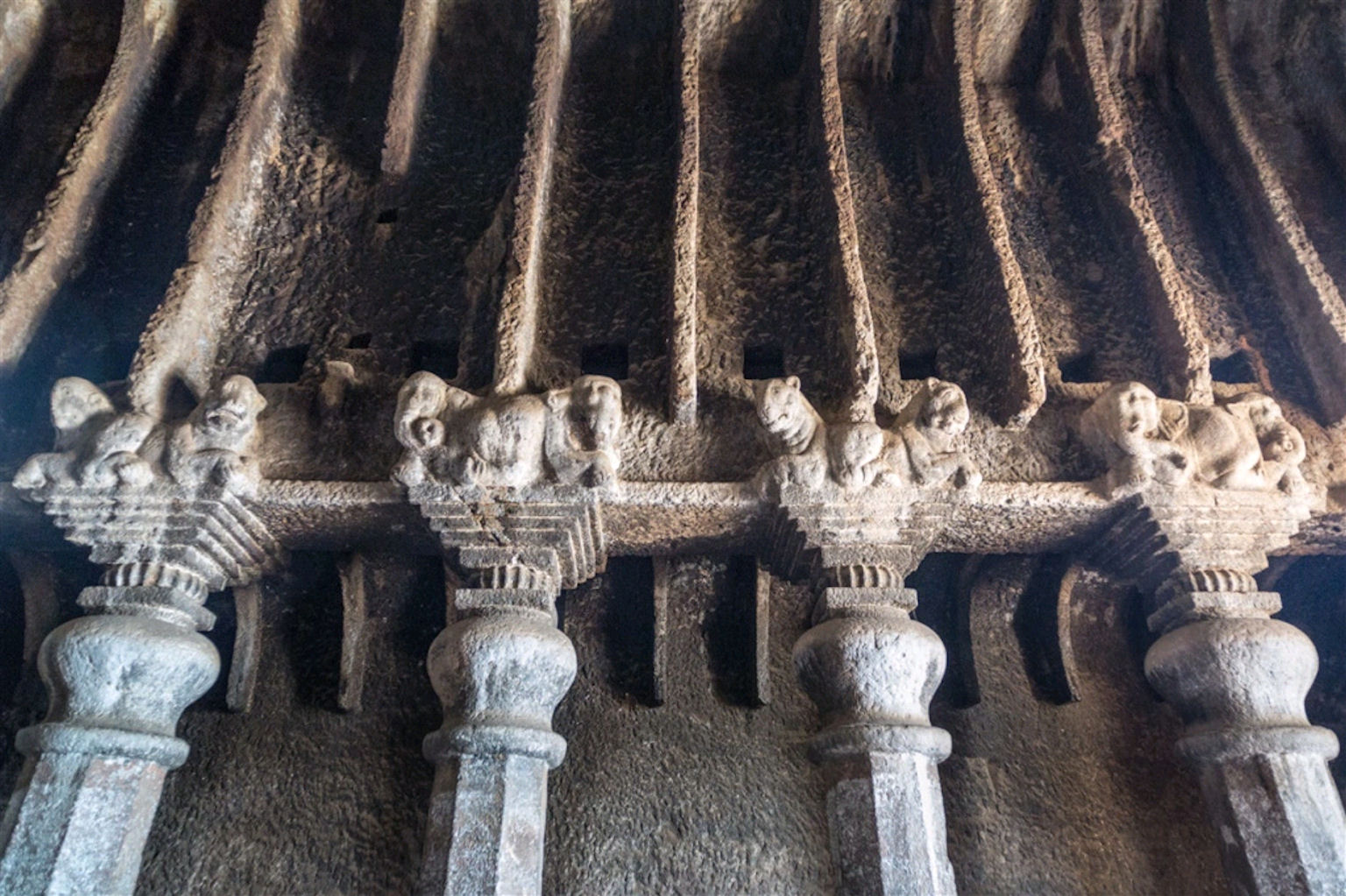
Lenyadri Chaitya pillar capitals.

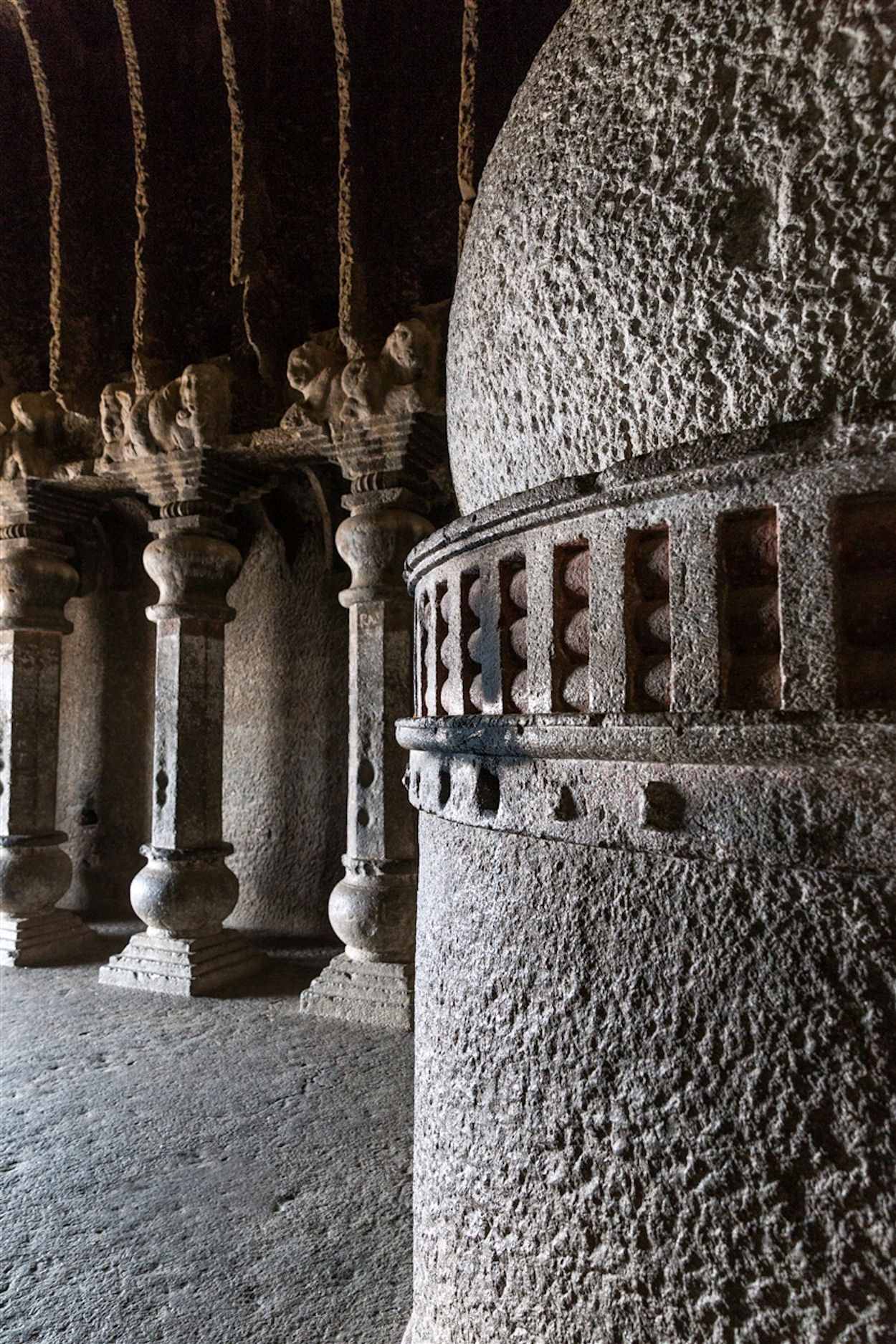
Chaitya dagoba.

The Satakarni period pillars begin with a four-plated pyramid structure, then a waterpot base, followed by an eight-sided shaft, above a reversed pot, then a capital in five plates, and on the top the amalaka or cogwheel pattern. The capital has animal figures like lions, elephants, a sphinx and tigers. Parts of the pillar are broken. Behind the relic-shrine, are six eight-sided pillars, arranged in a curve. "The stupa consists of a drum with a moulding below and railing above, a globular dome and a corbelled (with "a projection jutting out from a wall to support a structure above it") dome with a railing at the base." The stupa has Buddhist tridents carved on it. A hole is carved for fixing garlands in the front and 5 holes on the top probably to fix a central wooden umbrella and side flags. A 2nd century, swastika-flanked inscription on the back wall of the veranda translates: "A meritorious gift of a chapel cave by the distinguished Sulasadata, son of Heranika of Kalyana [modern Kalyan near Mumbai]."

Between caves 5 and 6, on higher level, is an excavation originally intended either for a dwelling or for a seat, but converted into a cistern following discovery of a rock-fault. On its left side is a bench.

Cave 14

This cave, also a chaitya-griha, has a flat roof. However, it has no pillars in the hall that measures 6.75 metres (22.1 ft) in length; 3.93 metres (12.9 ft) in width and 4.16 metres (13.6 ft) in height. It has a pillared veranda; pillars are in octagonal shape. The stupa is in three steps with a base of 2.6 metres (8.5 ft) diameter. The rim has a railing design surrounded by a cylindrical drum with "a square harmika with railing pattern and an inverted stepped pyramidal abacus." A carved chhatri covers the ceiling. The pillars of the veranda consist of octagonal shafts resting on ghata base over a stepped pedestal. An inverted kalasha adorns the top, which also has a corbelled abacus. Inscription on the back wall of the veranda dates the cave to the 2nd century CE. The inscription translates as: "A meritorious gift of a chapel cave given by Ananda, a son of Tapasa and grandson of Upasaka."

== Other viharas (monk dwellings) ==
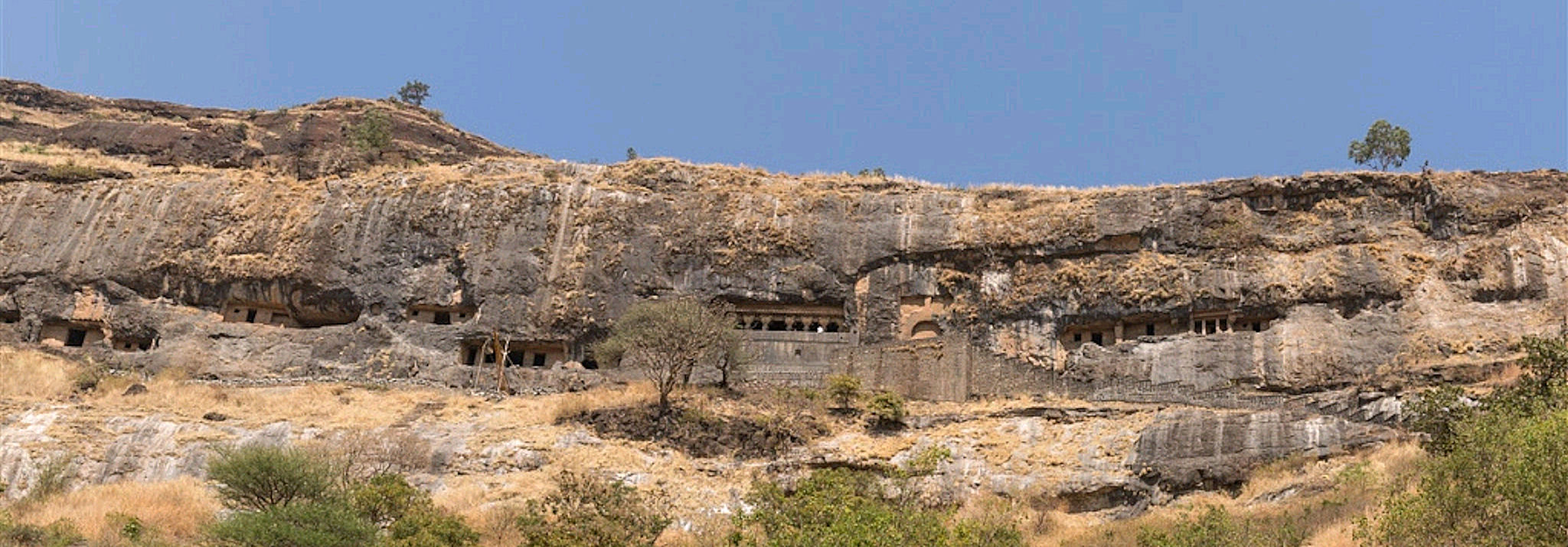
Lenyadri cave complex. The caves are numbered from right to left (east to west).

Cave 1

Cave 1 is divided into four parts: a veranda, a middle room, a cell, and a half cell. The veranda has a bench along the right wall. Its front possibly had two quadrangular pillars, traces of one are seen around the ceiling. A rock beam was present over the pillars, above the beam ribs and a rail pattern could have existed. In a recess below the veranda is an earth-filled cistern. A door with a small window to the left leads into the middle room. The middle room has a bench along the right wall. Towards the back of the middle room, to the left, is the half cell and to the right the cell. The half-cell has a bench along the right wall and to the left, has a square window connecting it to cave 2. A door with grooves for fitting a wooden frame, leads into the cell which has a bench along its right wall.

Cave 2

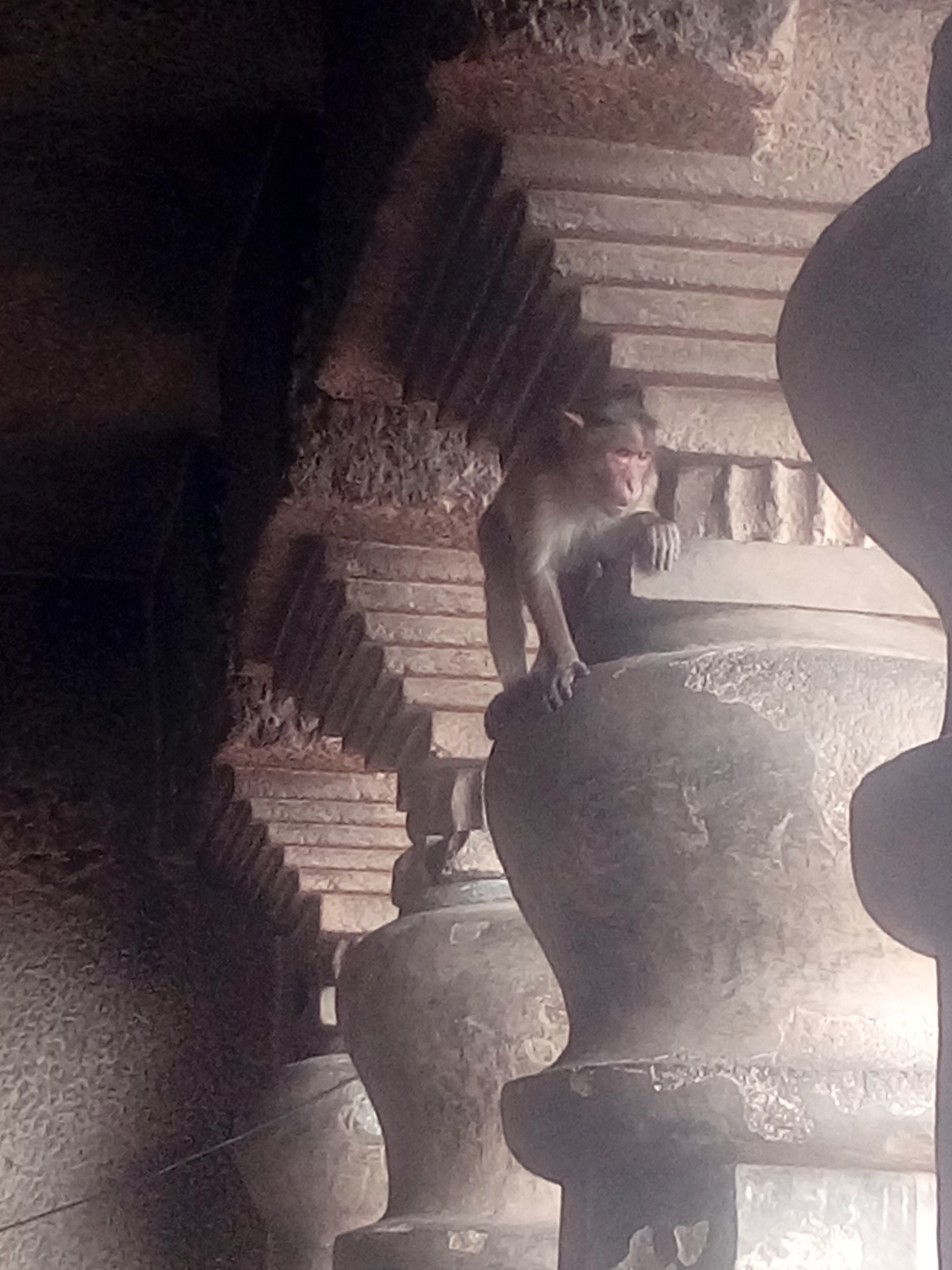
Lenyadri pillars & a monkey.

Cave 2 is similar to cave 1 in design. The veranda has two pillars and two pilasters, a bench between each pillar and pilaster with curtains in the back, which have a rail pattern. Over the pillars rests the rail-patterned rock beam, above which is the ceiling. Parts of the pillars and pilasters are broken. In front over the beam project rock imitations of rafters. A doorway with grooves for a wooden frame, leads into a middle room, with a bench along the left wall. The position of the hall-cell and cell are exchanged with respect to cave 1 design. Each has a bench.

Cave 3

Cave 3 has an open veranda and a cell. The veranda has a bench along the back wall. A door leads to a cell, which has a seat in a left recess. In front of the recess, below the seat, are vertical bands. Between caves 2 and 3 there is a seat in the front, in a recess.

Cave 4

Cave 4 has an open veranda and a cell. The veranda has a bench, along the back wall. A grooved door leads to a cell, which has a bench along the right wall. A broken window is to the left of door and to its right, a small hole, which could have been used to wash feet before entering the cell.

Cave 5

Cave 5 is located 12 feet (3.7 m) lower to left of cave 4. It is divided into 3 parts: veranda, a middle hall and seven cells of varying size, three in the back wall and two in each side wall. Thus it is known as a saptagarbha layana (seven cell dwelling). The veranda had two pillars and two pilasters with pot capitals of the Satakarni period (B.C. 90-A.D. 300), of which only the right broken pilaster and a trace of the base of the right pillar remain. In front of the veranda, an open court with two steps lead to the veranda. To the right of the court is a cistern. In the back wall of the veranda, to the left of the door to the middle hall, close under the broken verandah ceiling, is a single line inscription, flanked by the Buddhist trident in the beginning and swastika at the end. It is translated as: "A meritorious gift of a seven-celled cave and cistern by a guild of corn-dealers." The door also has windows on both its sides. Throughout the middle hall in the front of the cells is a bench. A bench is also built in the back wall of the cells.

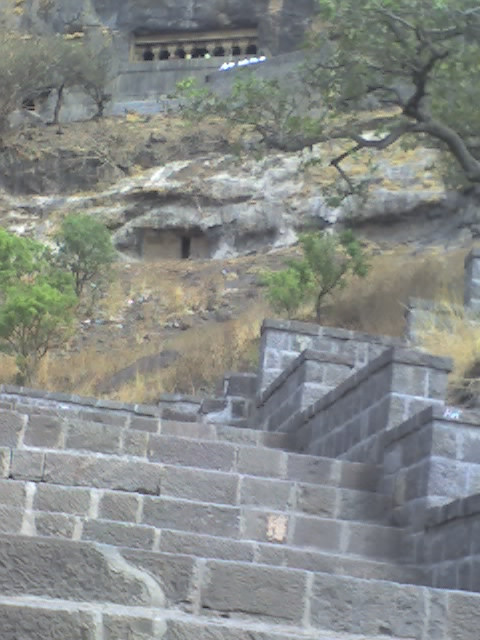
Approach to the Ganesha cave temple (Cave 7), seen at the top left. In the middle, a vihara located under the cave shrine is seen.

Cave 8

Cave 8 is a difficult-to-reach dwelling. It consists of a veranda with a cell and a half cell in its back wall, both entered through the veranda. The cell has a broken door, a small window, benched recess and a peg hole. The half cell has an open front and a bench at the back.

Cave 9

Cave 9 located to the right of Cave 8, can be entered via the latter's veranda. Cave 9 has its own veranda and a hall. The veranda has four Satakarni-period, broken pillars. The hall has a larger central door - with windows on either side - and a side door, both having grooves for wooden frames. The purpose of this hall is unknown and speculated to be a school or study.

Cave 10

Cave 10 is located at a higher level than cave 9 and is difficult to reach as its front is broken. An open veranda with a broken ceiling and floor leads to a middle room through a grooved broken door, which has windows on either side. The right wall of the hall has a recess with a seat. A cell to the left of the room has a seat in a recess. A door from the cell leads to a half-cell which has a recess and seat. Traces of painting are seen on the ceiling. Outside the veranda to the left is a cistern.

Cave 11

Cave 11 is difficult to reach with a broken front and a hall. To the left of a hall is a cell, lower in height than the hall. The hall has a grooved doorway and a recess with a seat at the back. Outside the hall is a view seat. The cave bears traces of paint.

Cave 12

Cave 12 is a small dwelling entered by a door from the veranda of cave 11. It has its own open veranda, which has a partly broken floor and ceiling and recessed benches on the left and right of the door to the middle room. The middle room has a small window to the left of the door and a seat recess in its right wall. In the back wall of the middle room to the left is a half cell - which has a seat recess - and a cell with a grooved door. The floor of the cave has a coating of cement, while the ceiling of the middle room bears painted concentric circles.

Cave 13

Cave 13 on a slightly higher level than cave 12, is a small dwelling with an open court and from 2 steps lead to a veranda. To the right of the court is a cistern. The veranda has a bench along its right wall. The front of the veranda has 2 benches, flanked by a plain eight-sided pillar and pilaster; some remnants of these survive. On the right pilaster is a double crescent ornament. A grooved door leads to a middle room, which has a bench along the right wall and seat recess to the left. A window is to the left of door. In the back wall of the middle room a cell (left) - with a grooved bench and a bench - and a half cell (right) are seen. The ceiling has traces of painting.

Cave 15

Cave 15 is a small dwelling consisting of a cell with an unproved doorway and a veranda. Though the side walls of the cave are still preserved, the ceiling is half broken.

Cave 16

Cave 16 is a small dwelling, on a slightly higher level above cave 15. It has a cell with a bench along its right wall and a veranda, which leads to the cell through a door. The side walls as well as a part of the ceiling are broken.

Cave 17

Cave 17 comprises a series of three small dwellings located along a row with a shared veranda. The first dwelling has a doorway flanked by broken windows on either side, leading to a middle room. The back room of the middle dwelling has a cell to the right and a half cell to the left. A window is located to left of door to the cell. The cell also has traces of painting. The half cell has a bench. The second dwelling has a middle room, a half cell to the left, and a cell, reached from the right of the half cell. The middle room has a bench. The half cell has a recess in its back wall, along with a bench. A grooved door leads from the half-cell to the cell, which also has a bench. A window in the right cell overlooks in to the middle room. In front of the doorway is a bench. The third and largest of the three dwellings consists of a middle hall. At the back wall of the hall there are two cells and two seat recesses. Along the right and rear walls runs a bench. The right cell as well as the left cell have grooved doorways, a window to the left of the doorway and a bench along each of their rear walls. In front of the hall door is a bench. In front of the broken veranda are holes for fixing wooden pillars. To the left of the veranda are two cisterns. Between cave 17 and cave 18, there are three other cisterns. In the recess of the first cistern, an inscription reads translated: "A meritorious gift of a cistern by Saghaka a goldsmith, son of Kudira of Kalyana." Another inscription in the recess of the second cistern reads translated: "A meritorious gift of a cistern by Lachhinika (wife) of Torika the Na daka [and] Nadabalika, wife of Isimulasami."

Cave 18

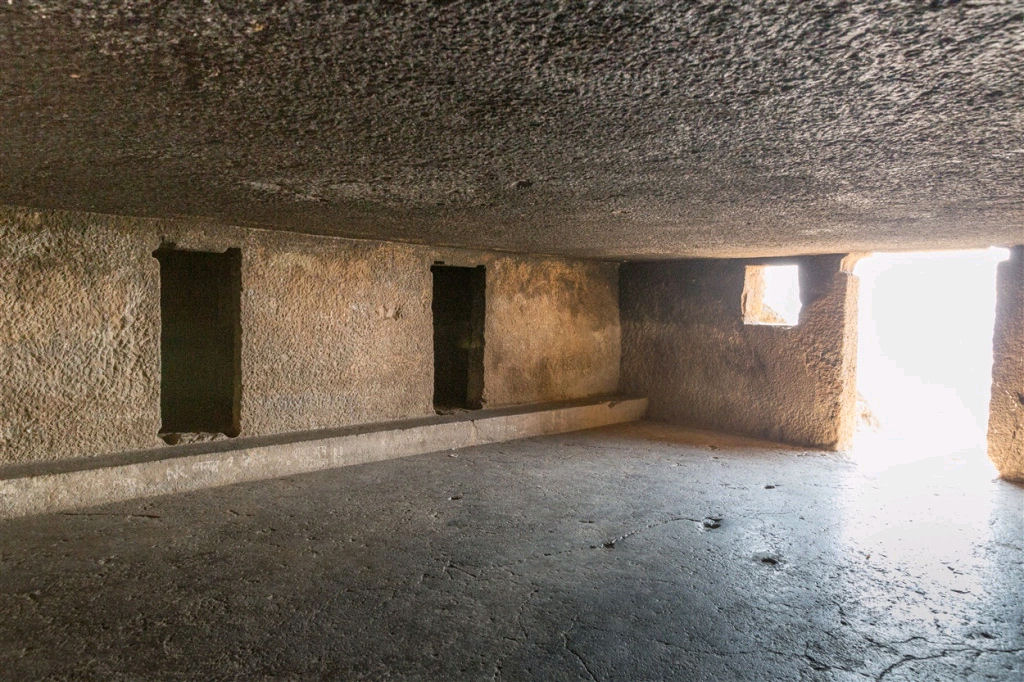
Inside of a vihara in Lenyadri.

Cave 18 is a dining hall with a front wall and a grooved doorway, on either side of which are windows. A bench runs along the back and side walls. The passage to the hall has 3 broken steps and an open court in the front. A cistern is located to the left of the court.

Cave 19

Cave 19 is a cell without a front wall and a bench runs along the left wall. The ceiling shows signs of a dressed stone or wooden screen from the right wall to the end of the bench. To the right is a small cell in the same roof, probably connected with cave 19. The small cell has a bench along its right wall and the grooved doorway. The cave has two cisterns.

Cave 20

Cave 20 is a small dwelling, hard to reach as the front is broken. To the right is a passage and to the left a cell with a bench along the entire left wall.

Cave 21

Cave 21 is approached through a small crevice from cave 20, in the absence of any direct approach. Its living space has a veranda of fairly large size. There is also an inner cell with a grooved door frame. Seating benches have been cut into shallow spaces both in the cell and in the veranda.

Cave 22

Cave 22 adjoins cave 21 on the left and it was also a dwelling unit with a bench for the entire length of the back wall. A window from this hall overlooks another smaller room. An entry through a grooved door gives access to a long corridor and in the back wall of which is an inscription that discloses the name of the donor and the monastic order.

Cave 23

Cave 23 has two dwelling units with a long passage with shallow niches with seating provisions on the left wall. A door provides links to the rooms. A 2 feet (0.61 m) niche in the back wall between the two rooms gives no clue of its purpose.

Cave 24

Cave 24 is a long cave with difficult access that leads into a cistern with seating arrangements in the niches. There is a door access to the passage, which also has benches for seating.

Cave 25

Cave 25 is longer than cave 24 with several small and big rooms. These rooms also have seating arrangements in niches which display irregular excavations denoting poor condition of the rock, which probably stopped further work on this cave.

Cave 26

This is plain cave located below cave 6, which is a chaitya (chapel) cave.

=== Description ===
Passing round the east end of the hill, after a walk of fully a 1.61 kilometres (1.00 mi), or about 6.4 kilometres (4.0 mi) from the town, in another spur of the Sulaiman Pahar, is a group of caves in the face of the hill, 120 metres (390 ft) above the level of Junnar, and facing S.S.W. They are usually represented as inaccessible, from the precipice in front of them being almost perpendicular; they are very difficult of access, and dangerous to attempt for any one not accustomed to climbing.

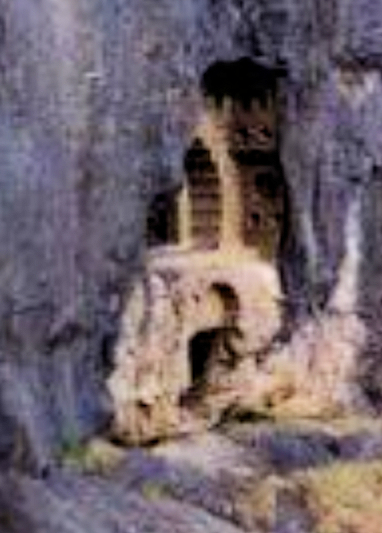
The small Chaitya cave.

The most easterly of them is a small Chaitya-cave only 249 centimetres (8 feet 3 inches) wide, and 680 centimetres (22 feet 4 inches) in length, or 467 centimetres (15 feet 4 inches) from the door to the dagoba, which is 147 centimetres (4 feet 10 inches) in diameter and 284 centimetres (9 feet 4 inches) high. The walls are not straight, nor the floor level. The side aisles have not been begun, and altogether no part of the interior is quite finished, except the upper part of the dagoba. To the top of the architrave or triforium is 487 centimetres (16 feet), and to the centre of the roof 553 centimetres (18 feet 2 inches). Outside, the façade is carved with Chaitya window ornaments, some enclosing a dagoba, and others a lotus flower; while the rail ornament is abundantly interspersed in the usual way. The fronton round the window is also carved with a geometrical pattern. The details of this cave seem to indicate that it is perhaps as early as those at Bedsa and Karle, and consequently it is among the earlier excavations about Junnar.

Next to it, but higher up and almost inaccessible, are two cells; then a well; and, thirdly, a small vihara, with three cells, two of them with stone-beds. Some rough cutting on the back wall between the cell-doors resembles a dagoba in low relief, but it is quite unfinished. Outside are two more cells and a chamber or chapel at the end of a veranda that runs along in front both of the vihara and the cells.
