= Hadsar =

Hadsar Fort
- Pune district, Maharashtra
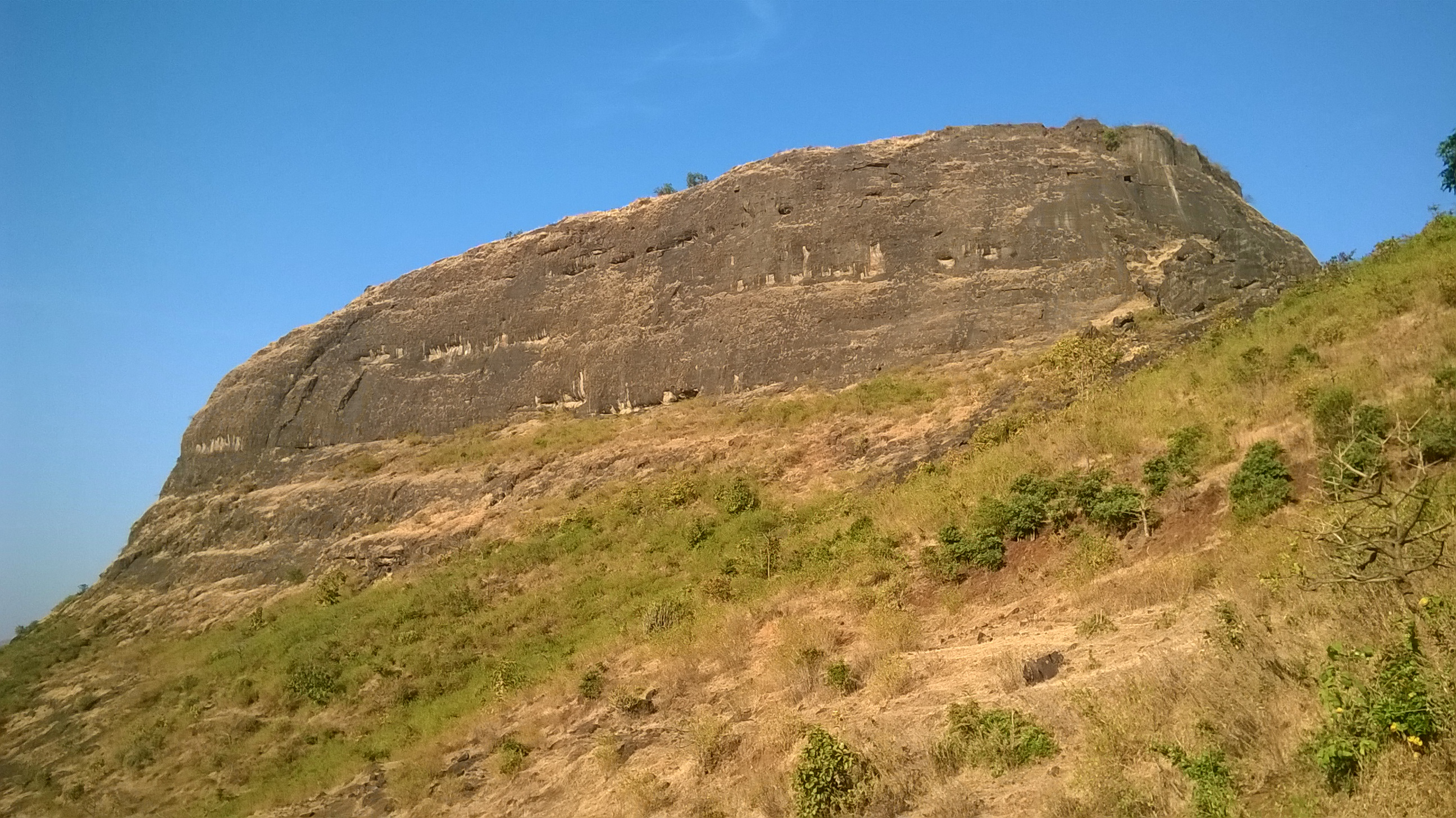
- Hadsar fort

Site information
- Type: Hill fort
- Owner: Government of India
- Open to the public: Yes
- Condition: Ruins

Location
- Shown within Maharashtra
- Location within Maharashtra
- Coordinates: 19°16′13.1″N 73°48′09.3″E
- Height: 3200 feet

Site history
- Built: Satvahan Era
- Materials: Stone

Hadsar fort is among the many forts in Junnar region of Pune district which were meant for protection of the ancient commercial trade route from Maval region to Kalyan via Naneghat. There is a marvelous sculpture design of the bastion and the fort entrance, which is not seen elsewhere. They are all carved from a single rock.

== History ==
It is believed that this fort was built in the Satavahana Era. This fort was mentioned in the Treaty of Purandar between King Shivaji and Moghuls. This fort was captured British in 1818.

== Places to see ==
The uniqueness of this fort is in the construction of the entrance gate. The entrance gate, rooms for sentries, water cisterns, steps to the fort are all chiselled from single rock. There is temple of Mahdev at the top of the fort. There are stone cut idols of Ganesh, Garud and Hanuman in the temple. There is a big lake on the fort.

== How to reach ==
The Hadsar fort is near the Village Hadsar. Hadsar village is located 13 km North-West of Junnar. From the village, there are two paths to reach the fort top. The easiest way is from the southern side, which passes through the main gate. the other way is from the northern side of the Fort. There is a rock path of 20feet high to climb. There are rock-cut holds and thrust to rely upon, but is a very difficult yet thrilling experience. The help of experts with climbing apparatus and ropes should be taken while climbing. A night halt can be made in the Mahadev village. The route to the village Hadsar is shared in the link.

== Gallery ==
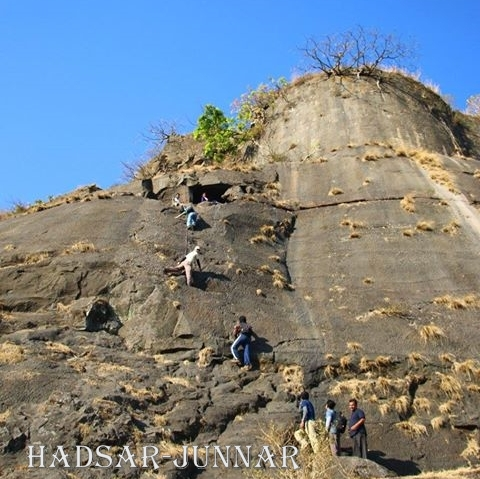
The northern climbing way

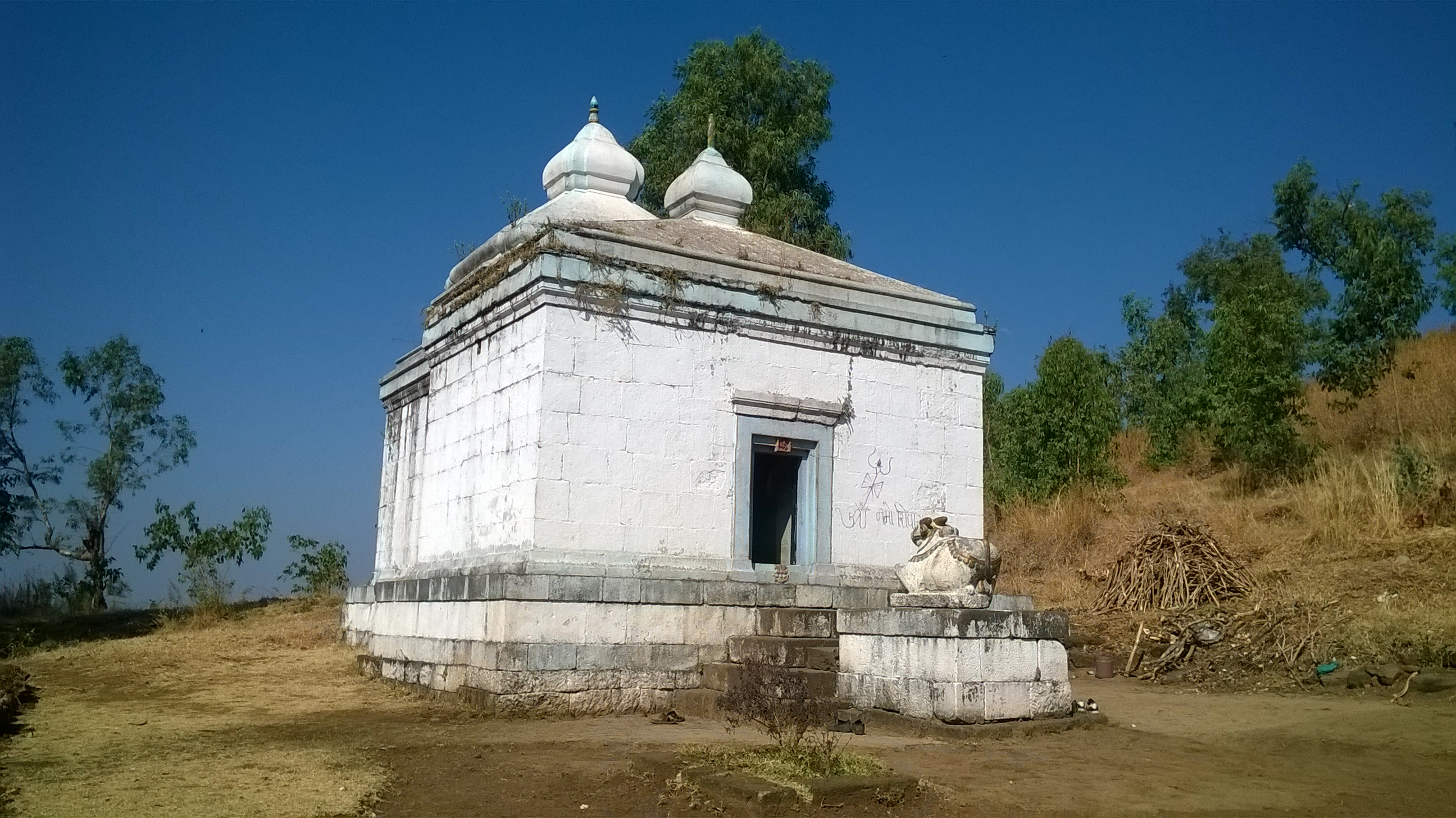
The mahadev temple

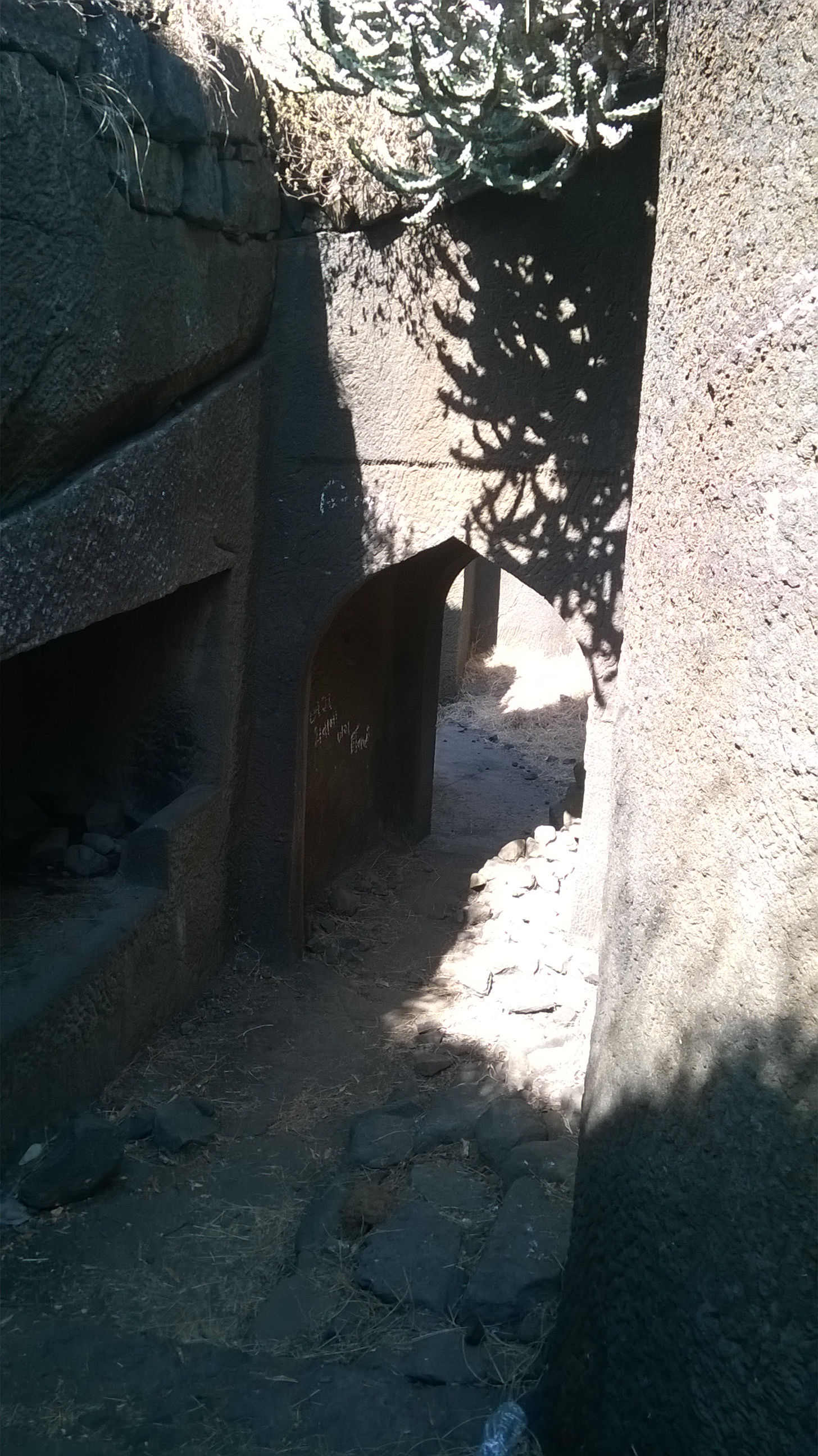
The main entrance

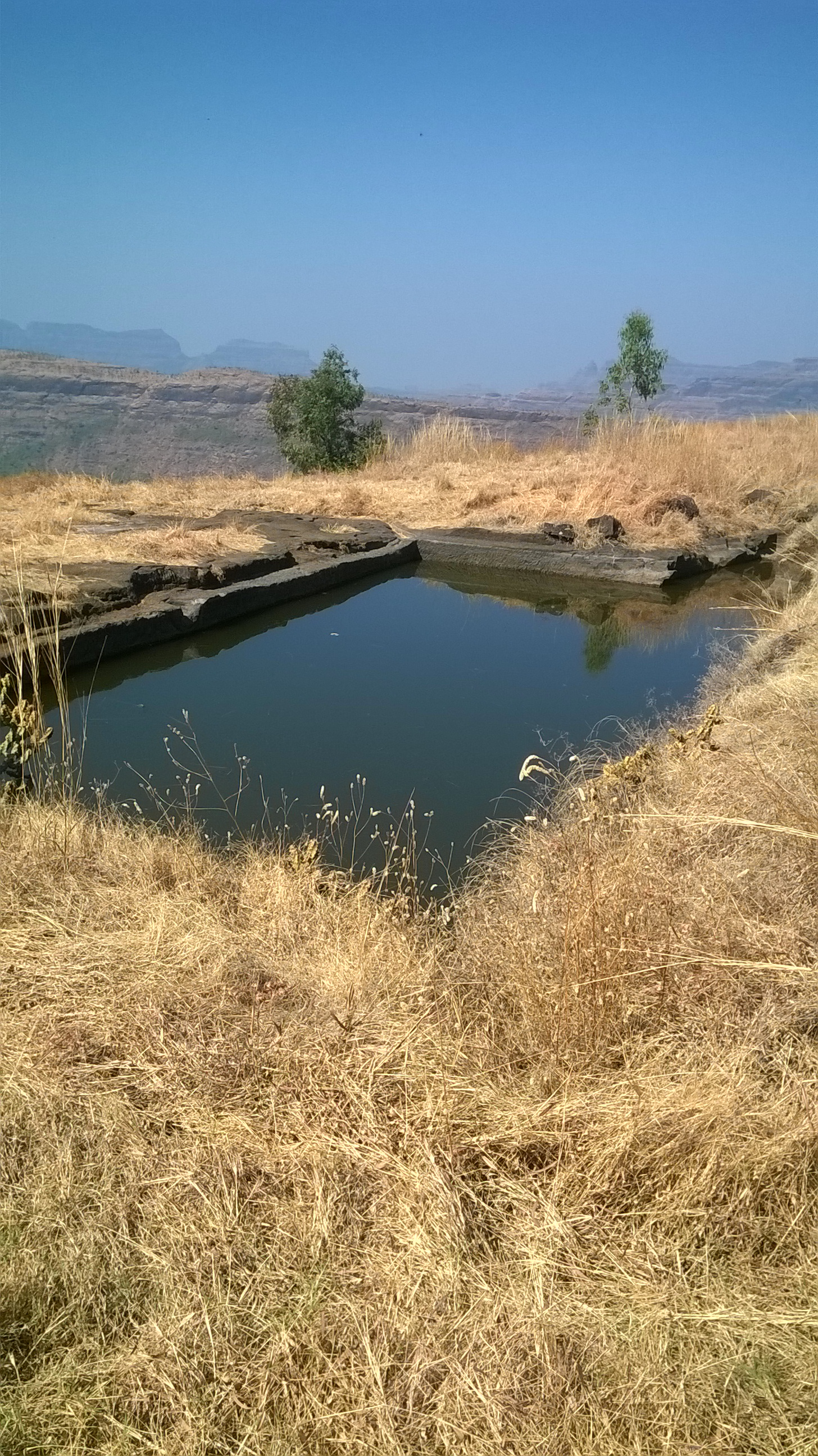
The water cistern on the fort

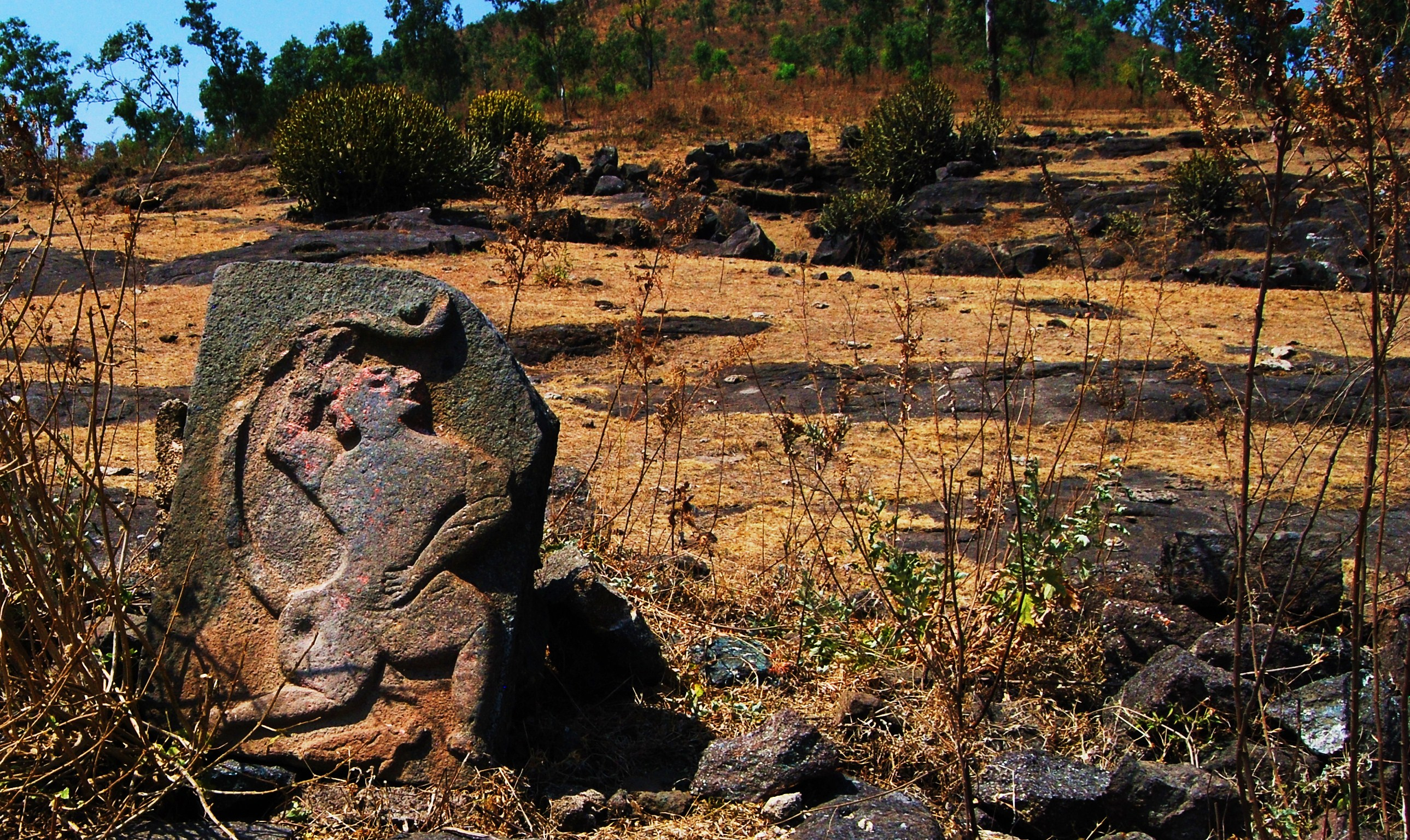
Hadsar fort Hanuman

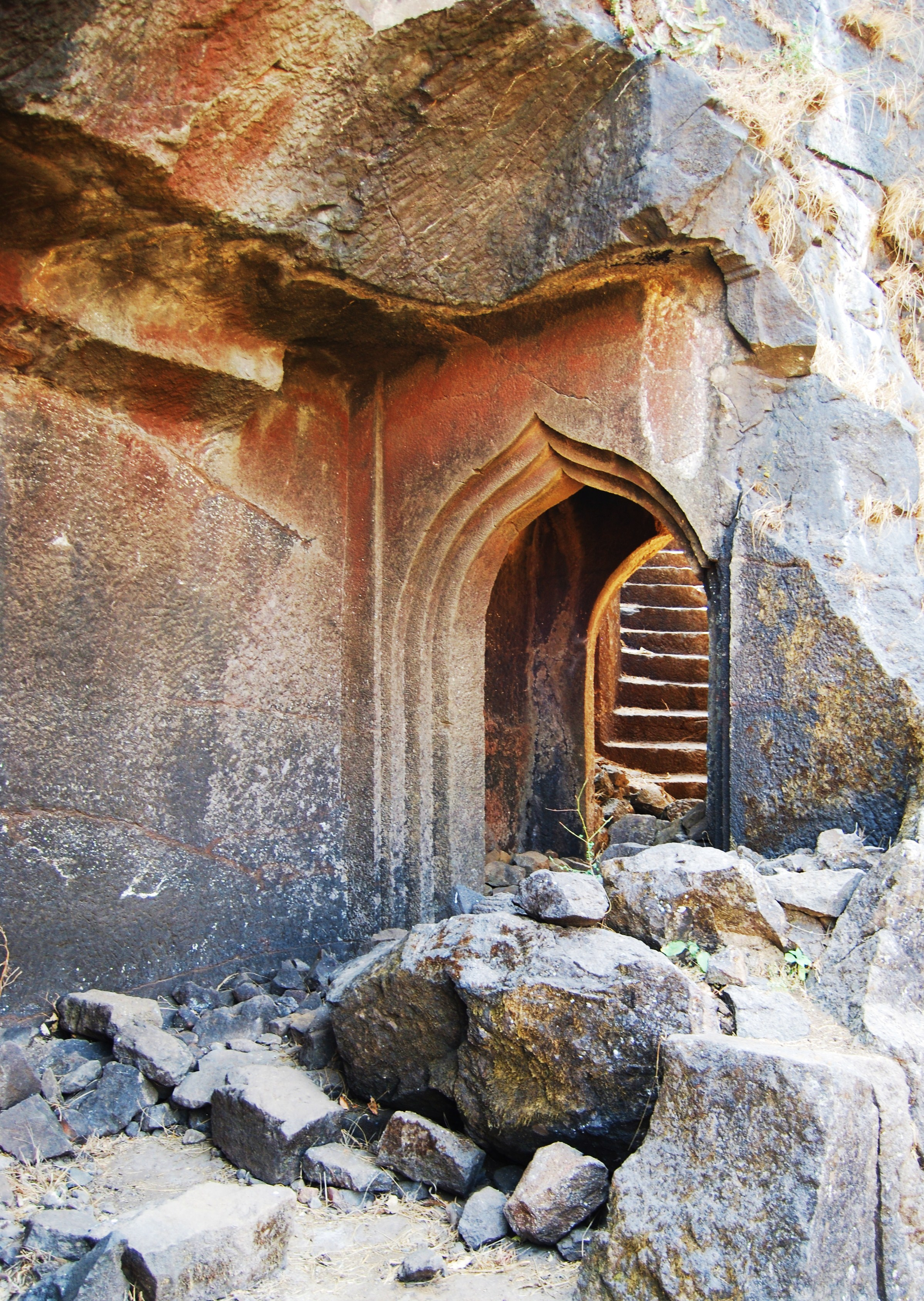
Hadsar fort- Monolithic Stone carved gate

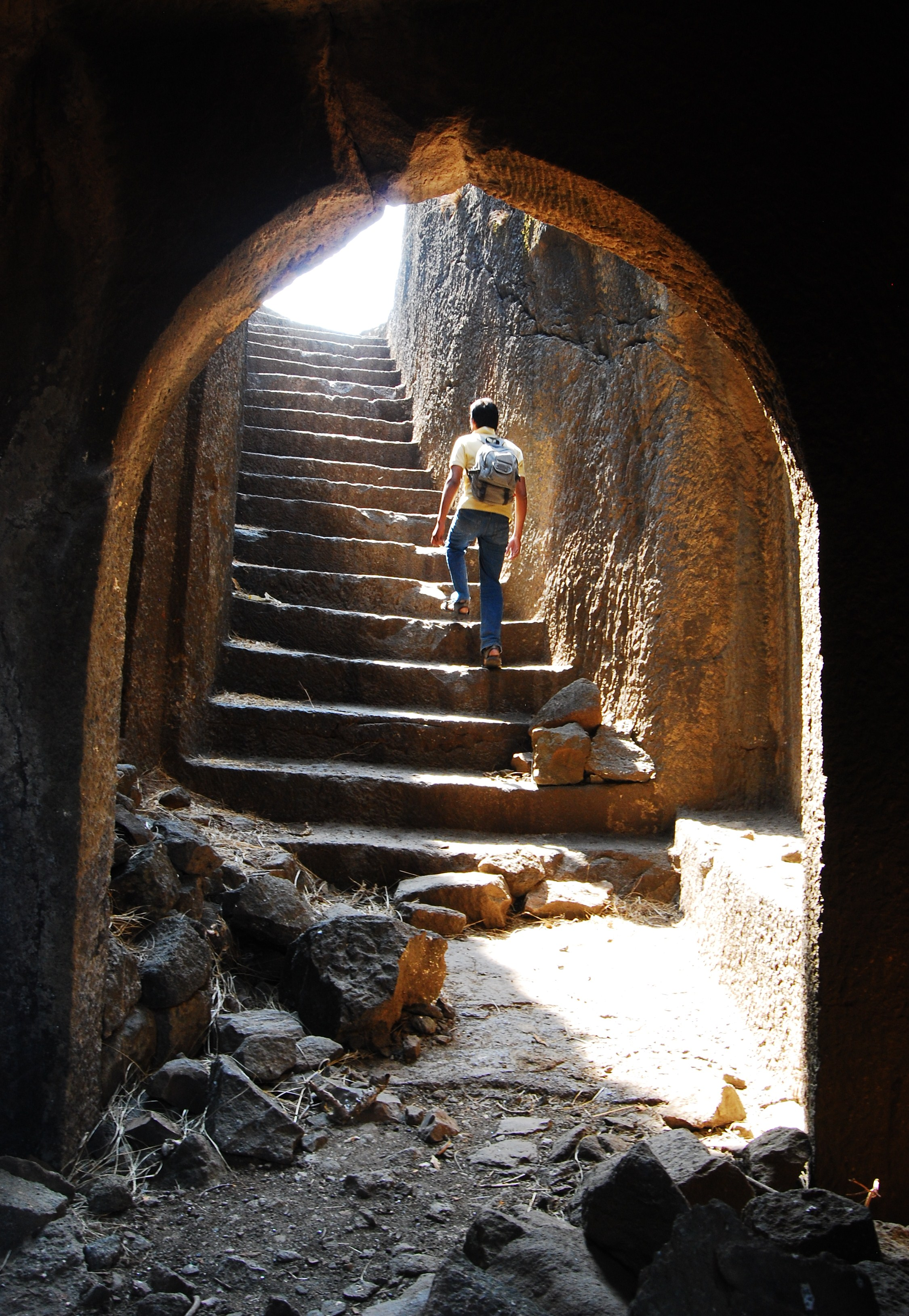
Hadsar fort stone gate

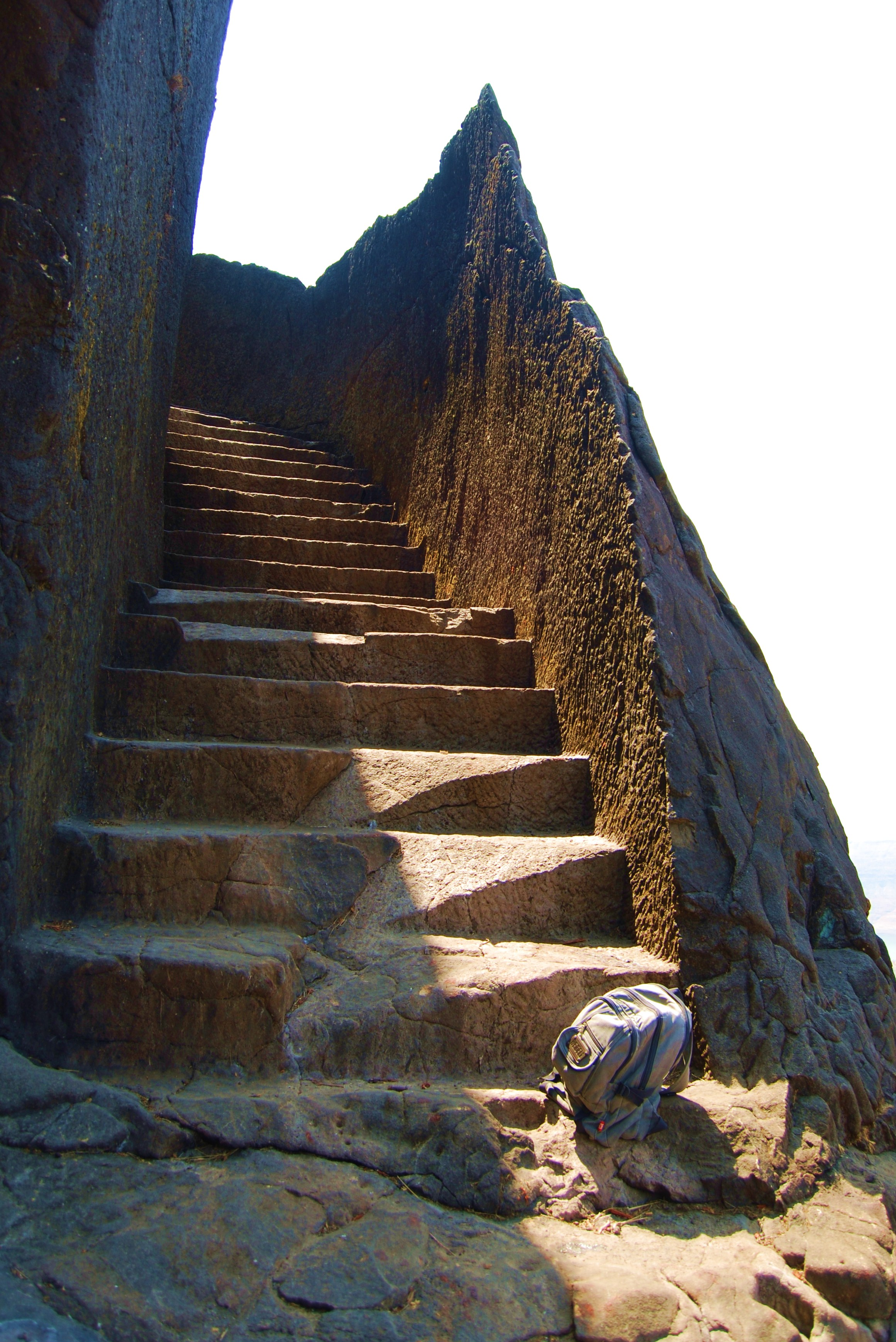
Hadsar fort Steps carved in stones

== See also ==
- Junnar
- List of forts in Maharashtra
- Naneghat
