= Shivneri Caves =

Ancient Buddhist caves in Maharashtra, India

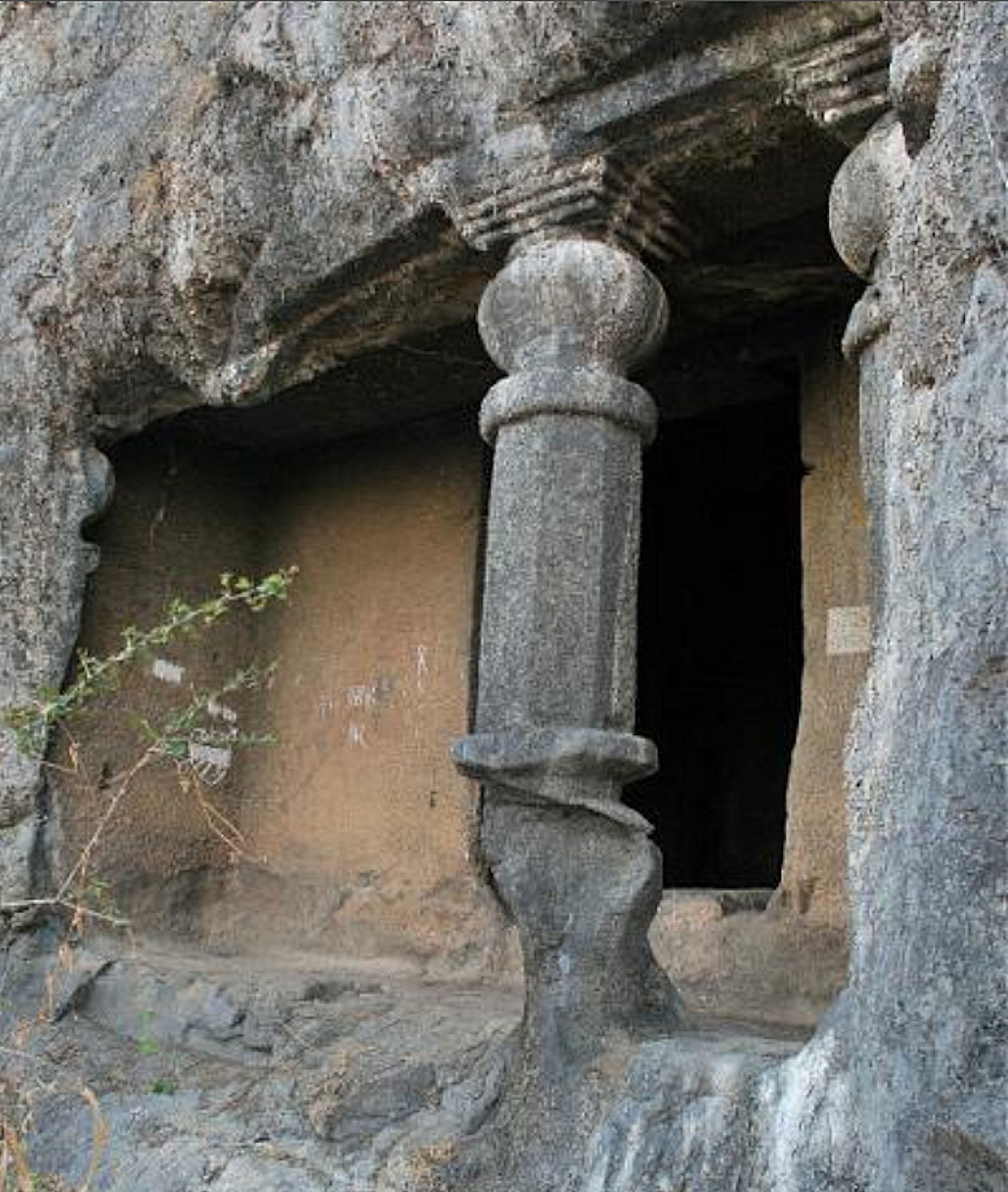
- Shivneri, East face, a cave of Group 2. Junnar, India.

- Location within India
- Location: Junnar
- Coordinates: 19.1990°N 73.8580°E
- Geology: Basalt

The Shivneri Caves are artificial caves dug for Buddhist monks circa the 1st century CE. These are now famous tourist attractions located on Shivneri Hill, about 2 km Southwest of Junnar, India. Other caves around the city of Junnar are: Manmodi Caves, Lenyadri, and the Tulja Caves.

== Description ==
The Shivneri Buddhist caves are located near Shivneri Fort on the top of the hill, where Shivaji Maharaja was born. It is a group of 60 caves that were excavated in the first part of the 1st century CE. At the beginning of the 2nd century CE, these caves were a flourishing center of Buddhist activities. The caves are essentially made of viharas or small cells, but there are also chaityas. The caves are scattered on three sides of the west–east-south triangle formed by Shivneri Mountain.

The caves are scattered around the hill, and categorized into several groups: the East group (1, 2 and 3), the West group, and the South group. Among the most important caves, we can mention:

  - Cave 26 – a two-story Vihara
  - Cave of 45 – Known as "Bara-kotri", it has 12 cells for resident monks.
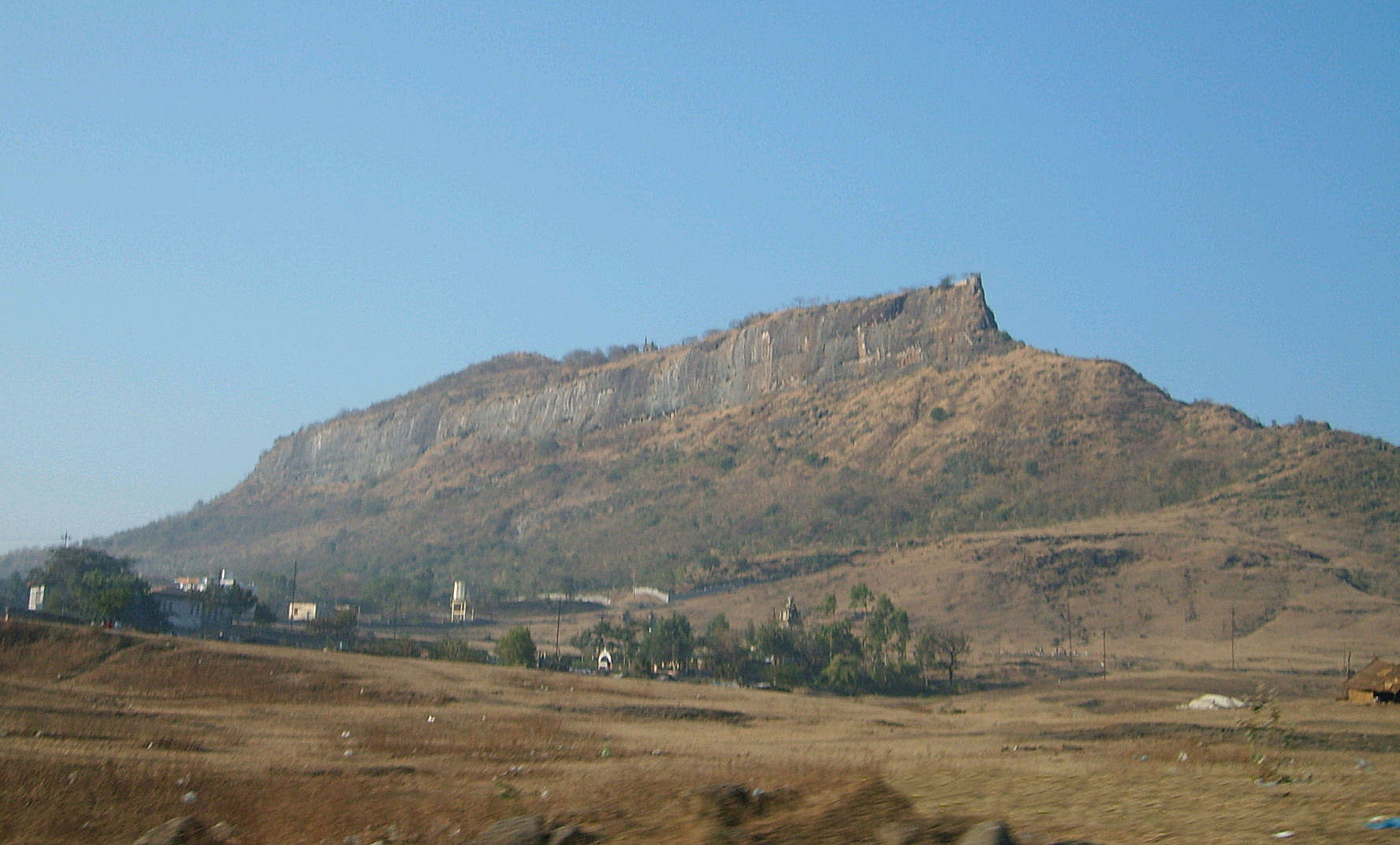
Shivneri hill, east side, seen from Junnar.

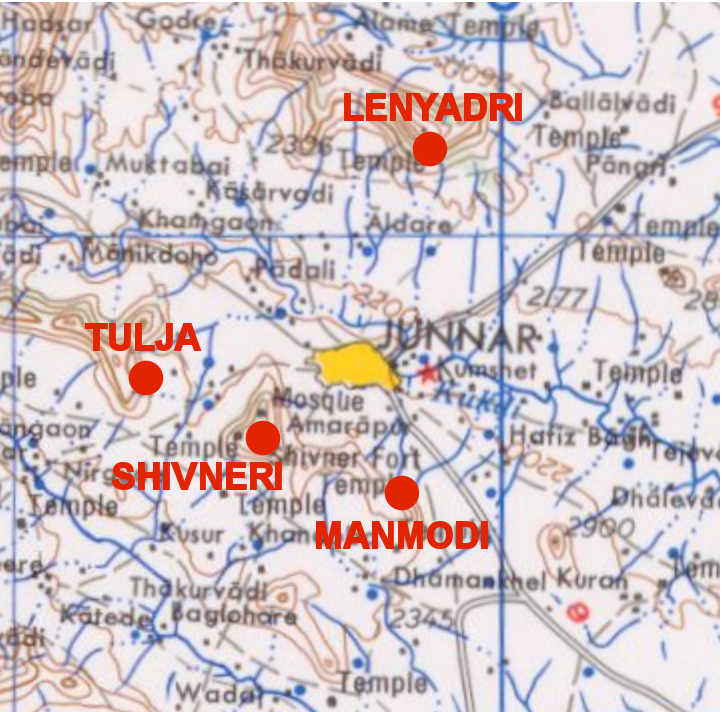
Location of Buddhist caves, including Shivneri Caves, around the city of Junnar.

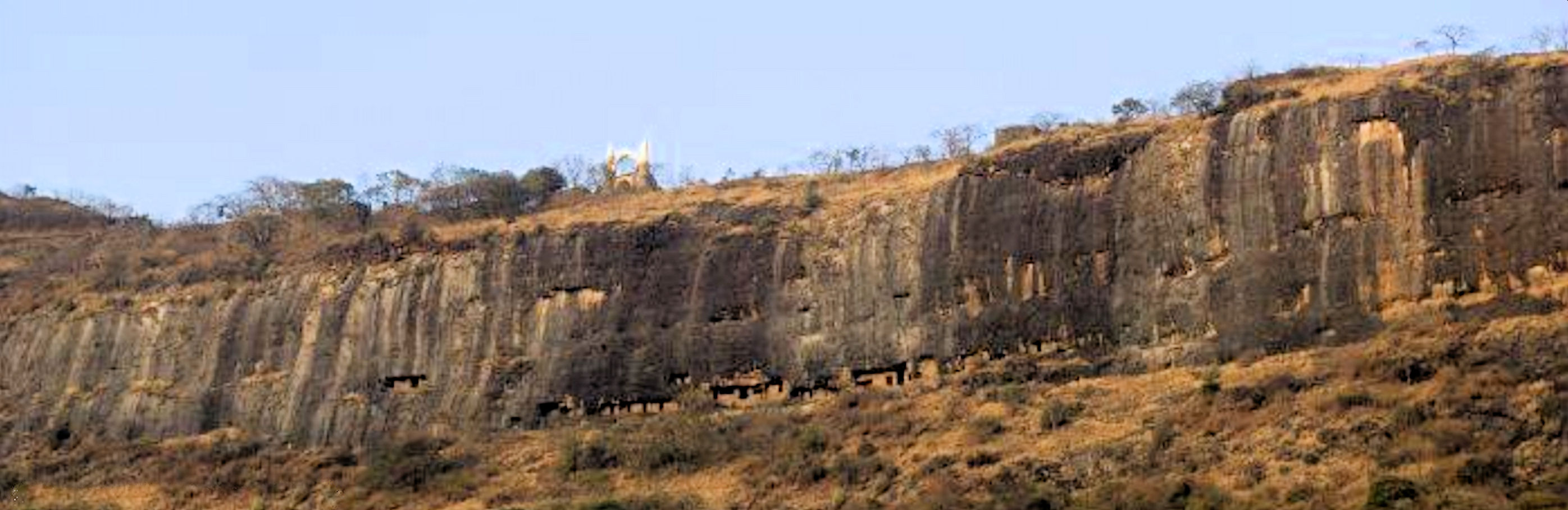
Shivneri East face, Group 3.

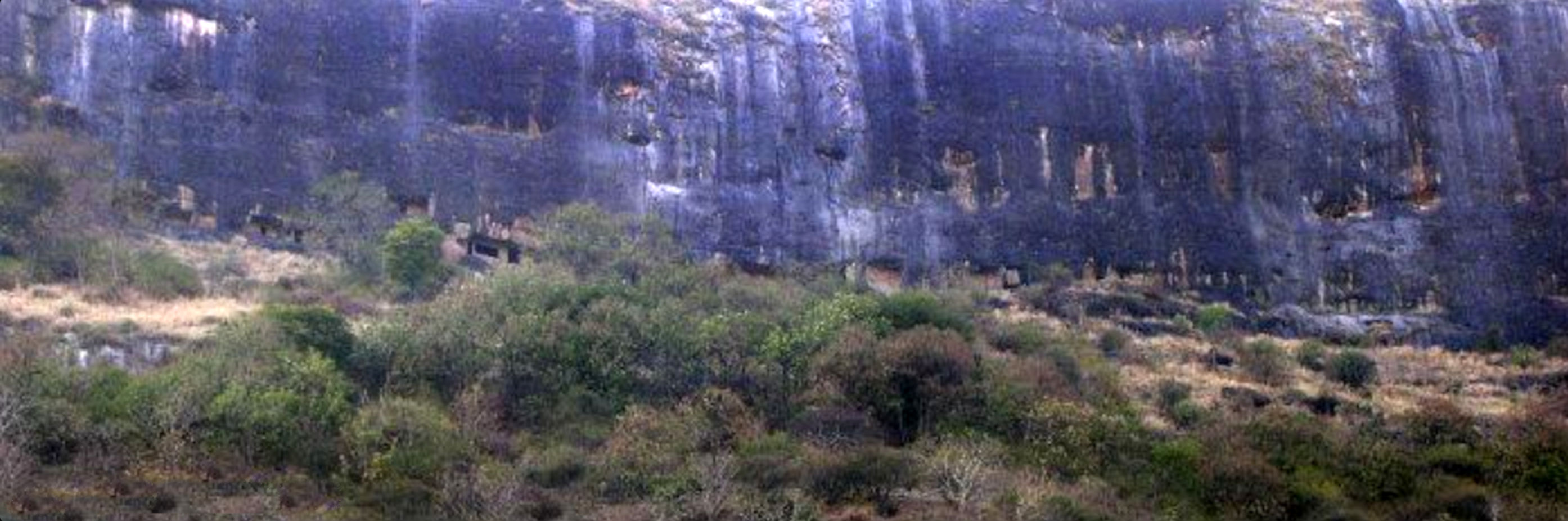
Shivneri East face, Group 1.

=== South Face: Great Chaitya (Cave 47) ===
Cave 47 is on the south face of Shivneri (19.194535°N 73.856492°E). It is one of the most remarkable Chaityas of the group. Inside are two rounded pillars and tiered capitals, similar to those found in Nasik (Pandavleni Caves). The hall measures 9.9x6.5m, and has a height of 5.8m. The cave contains a very beautiful stūpa with a "rail pattern" at the top. It is surmounted by a parasol. The ceiling is painted in color, consisting of squares in which are concentric circles of color (orange, brown and white).

The chaitya has on its outer face the dedicatory inscription of a merchant:

"A pious gift of charity, designed for the sanctuary, for the good and happiness of all, by Virasenaka, distinguished head of the family, confessor of Dharma"

— Inscription of the great Chaitya.

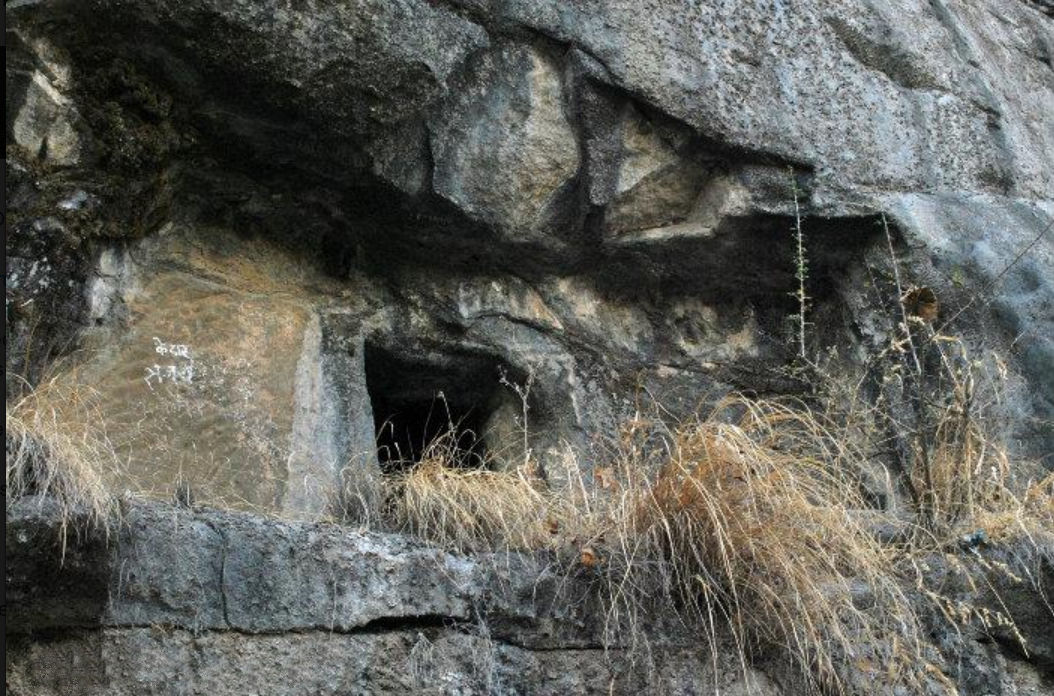
Remains of one of the cells of the south face of Shivneri.

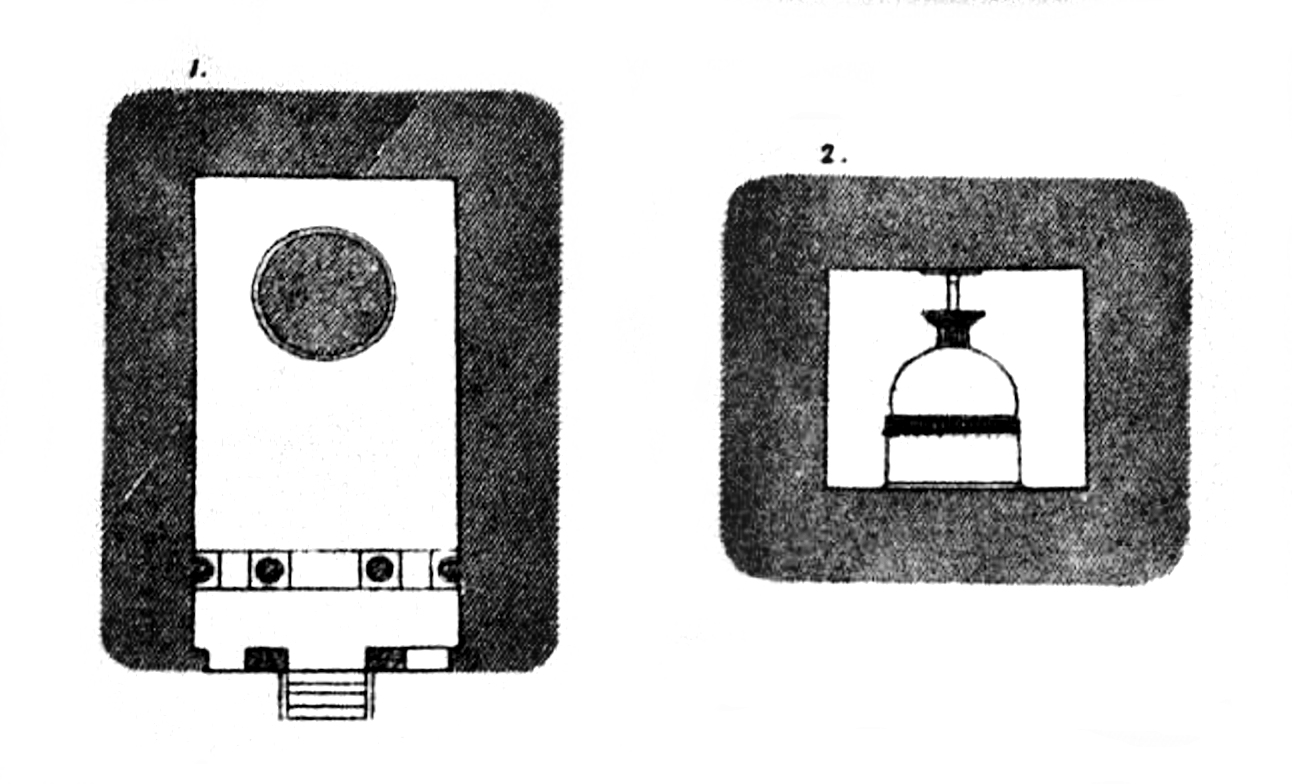
Map and section of the Chaitya.

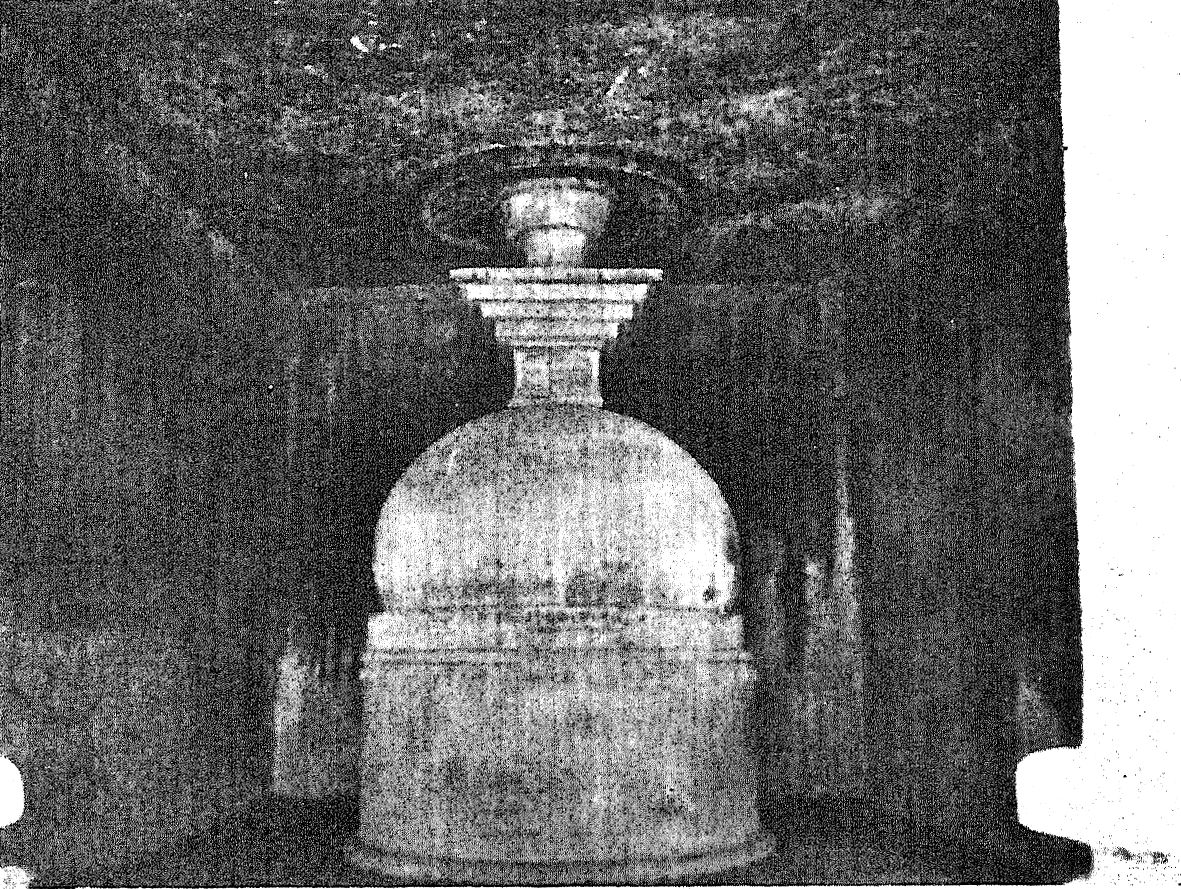
Stūpa, cave n ° 47.

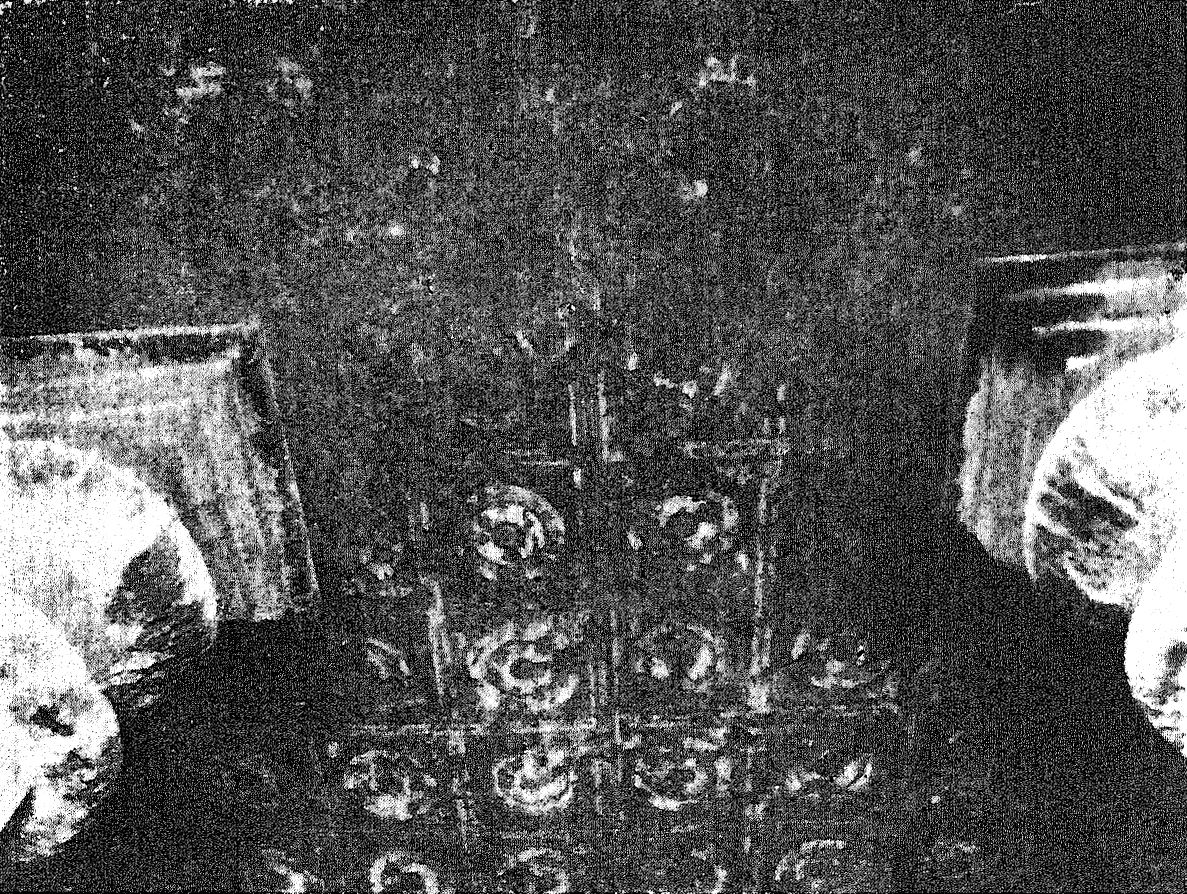
Ceiling paintings, cave n ° 47.

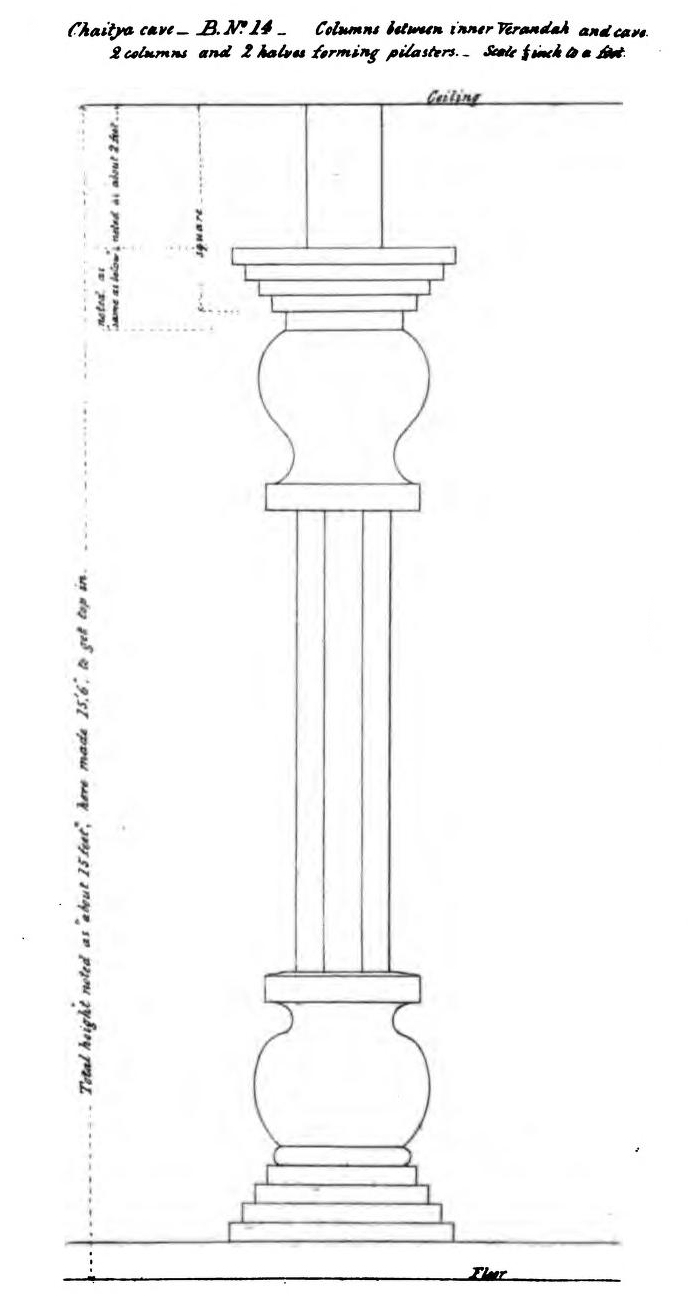
Pillar of the Chaitya cave.

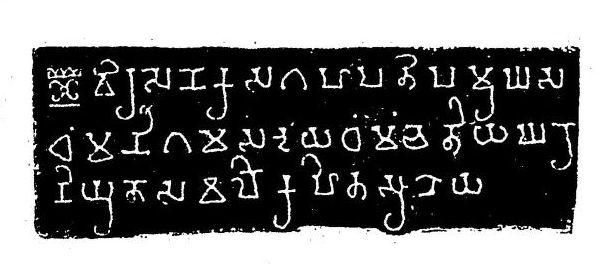
The dedicatory inscription of the Chaitya.

== Inscriptions by Yavanas ==
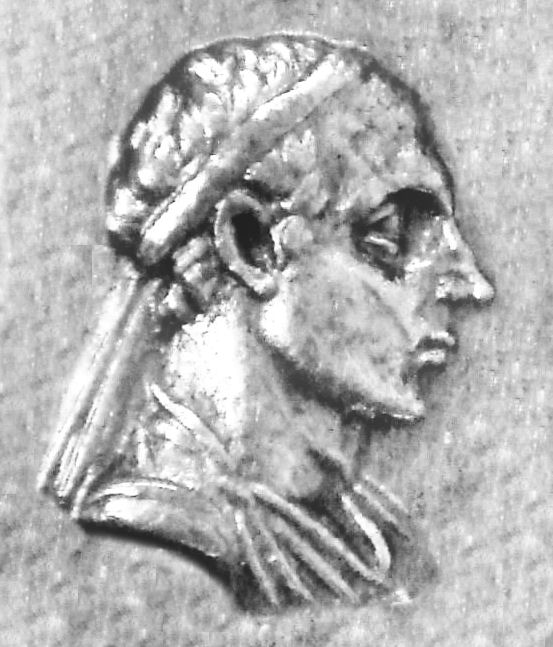
Portrait of Menander I, a Yavana king.

Two Buddhist inscriptions made by Yavanas (Indo-Greeks) were found in Shivneri. They suggest the involvement of men of Greek descent with Buddhism in India, as well as the continued presence and gradual acculturation of the Greeks in India in the 1st century CE.

Yavana inscription of cave 54

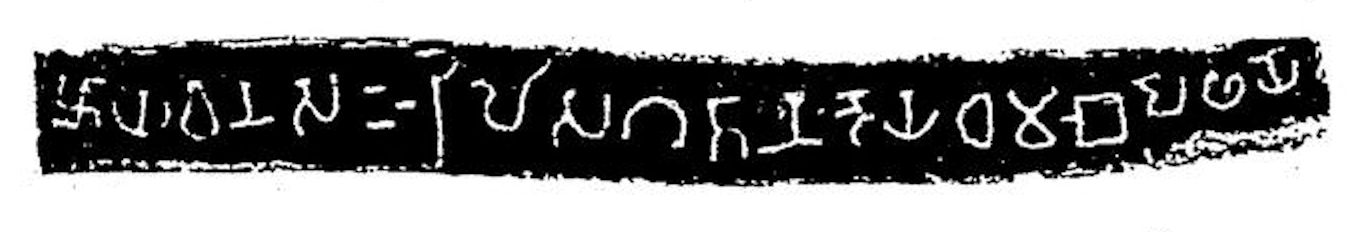
Yavana inscription, Cave 54

Yavanasa Irilasa Gatâna deyadhama be podhiyo
"Donation of two tanks by the Yavana Irila, in the name of the Gatas "

The inscription starts with the Buddhist symbol of the swastika (non-inverted), just before the word "Yavanasa".

Yavana inscription of cave 67

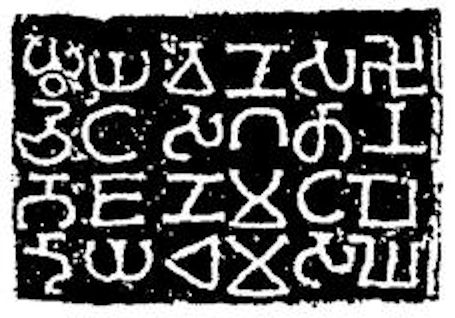
Yavana inscription, Cave 67.

Yavaṇasa
Citasa Gatâna
bhojaṇamatapo
deyadhama saghe
"Gift of a refectory
for the community (Sangha)
from Cita the Yavana,
on behalf of the Gatas."

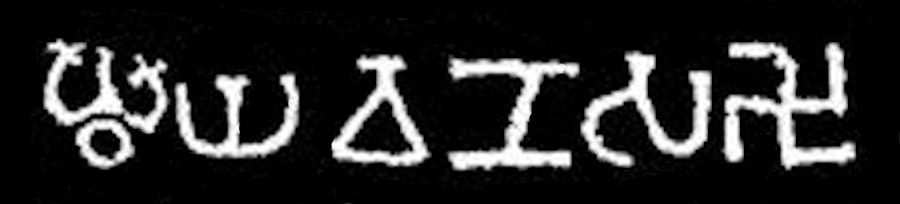
The word "Ya-va-ṇa-sa" in Brahmi. Here the "na" is written "ṇa", with the retroflex consonant "ṇ", which is also a common variation of "n".

On this second inscription, the Buddhist symbols of the triratna and of the swastika (reversed) are positioned on both sides of the first word "Yavanasa".

Other similar inscriptions mentioning donations from Yavanas have been found at Karla Caves, Pandavleni Caves, as well as Manmodi Caves.
