= Manmodi Caves =

Caves in Maharashtra, India

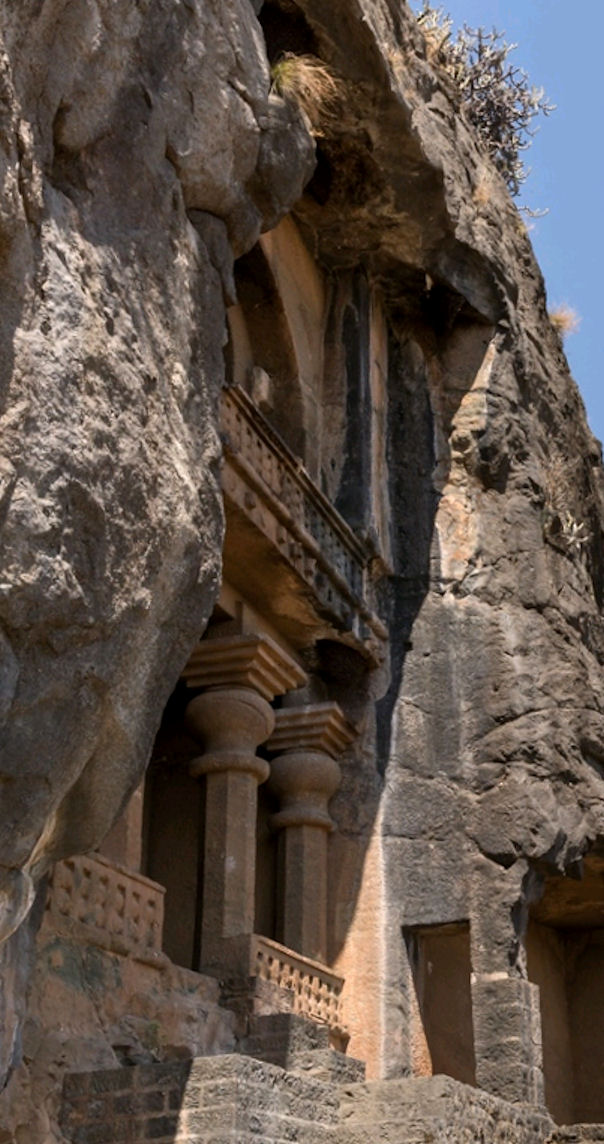
- The Chaitya at Bhimashankar caves, a part of Manmodi Caves, Junnar, India.

- Location within India Location within Maharashtra
- Location: Junnar
- Coordinates: 19.1859°N 73.8843°E
- Geology: Basalt

The Manmodi Caves are a complex of a rock-cut caves about 3 km to the south of the city of Junnar in India. Other caves surrounding the city of Junnar are: Tulja Caves, Shivneri Caves and Lenyadri caves.

It is thought that the caves were positioned on natural trade routes, formed by passes leading from the coast to the basaltic plateau of the Western Ghats. One of the caves in Manmodi has an epigraph mentioning the Western Satrap Nahapana bearing the title of Mahakshatrapa (Great Satrap).

== Description ==
The Manmodi hill lies south from Junnar, at a distance of about a 3 km. It contains three groups of excavations, the second of which is nearest to the road, and the first a considerable way along the north-west face of the hill, near where it turns to the north-east.

The caves are classified in three groups, also having specific names:

- Bhutalinga (भूत लेणी) group, with an inscription by a Yavana donor.
- Amba-Ambika (अंबा-अंबिका) group
- Bhimasankar (भीमाशंकर) group, southeast of Manmodi hill, with the inscription of Ayama, minister of Nahapana in 124 CE.

=== Bhutalinga group of caves ===
==== The Chaitya ====
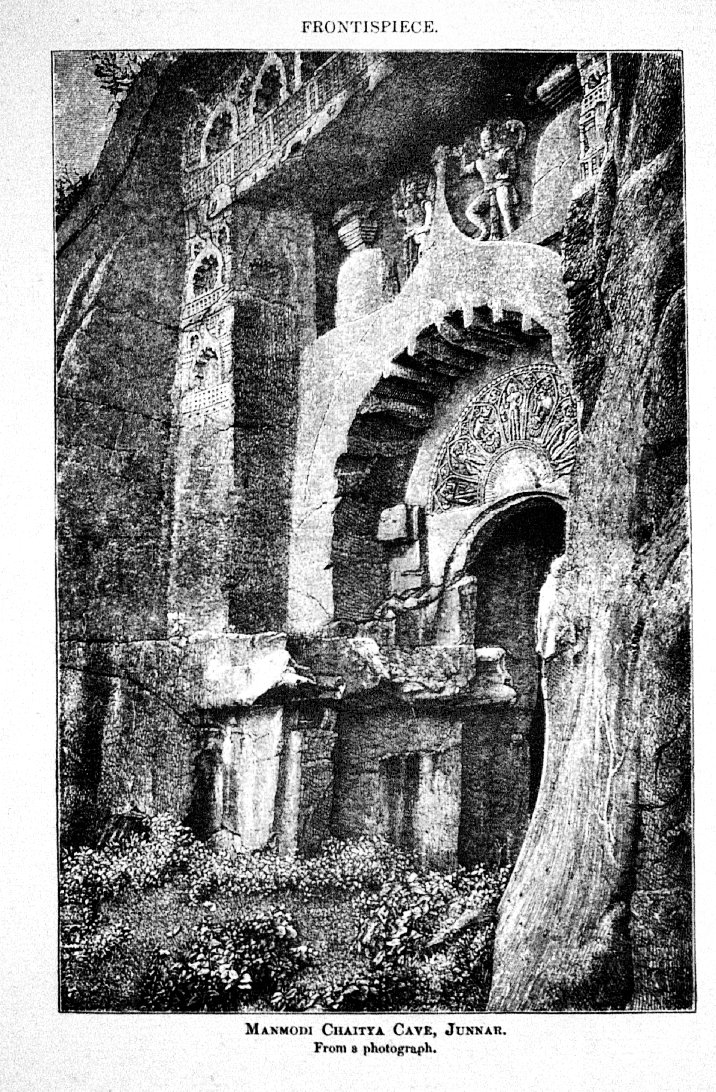
Manmodi Chaitya Cave. Woodcut from Photograph, 1880.

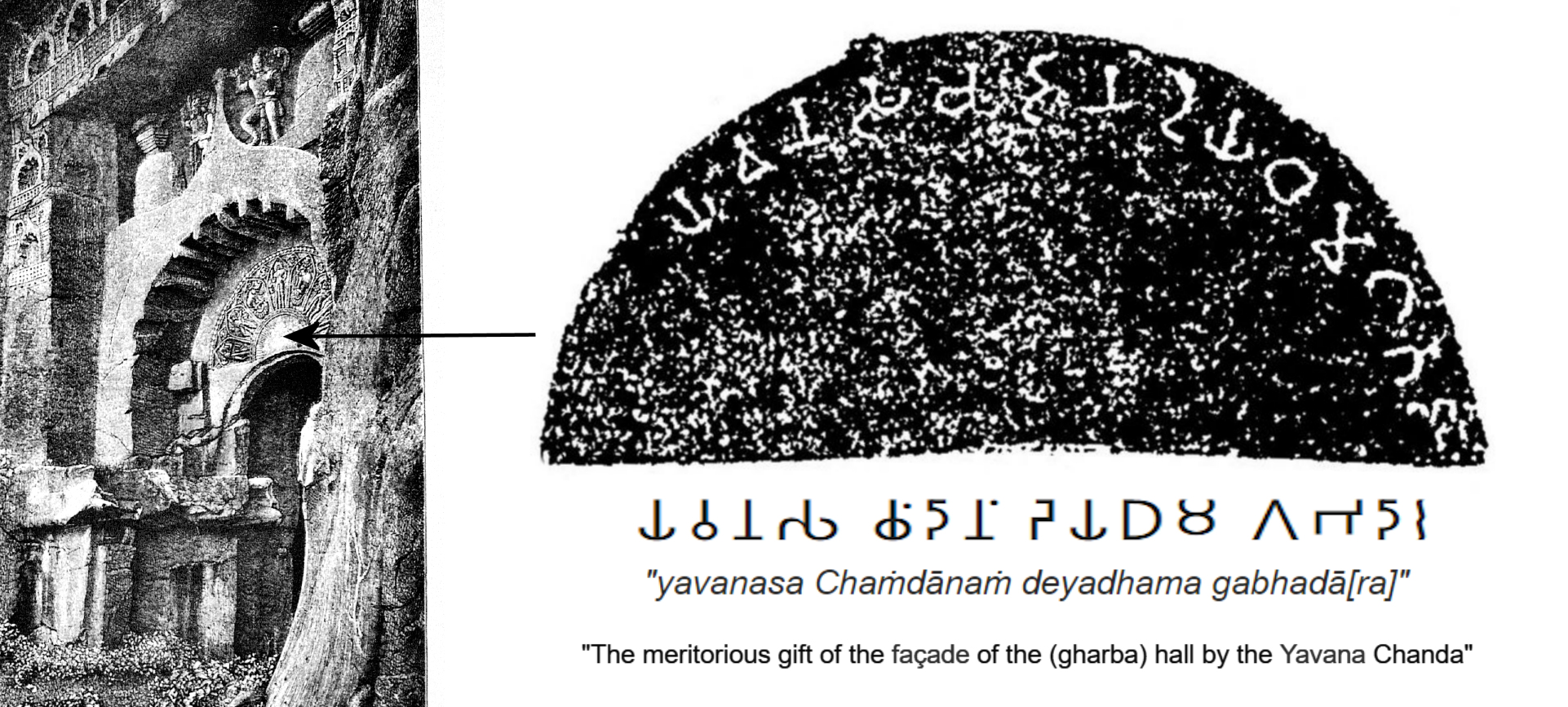
Dedicatory inscription by the Yavana donor.

These caves are the most western caves in the Manmodi group (19.1880°N 73.8784°E). The principal cave here is an unfinished Chaitya-cave. The door is nearly the whole width of the nave, and it has apparently had a small semi-circular aperture or window over it, but the lintel is broken away. This arch of the window, however, is not adjusted to the arch of the roof inside, which is much higher, nor does it occupy the relative position in the great arch on the façade assigned to the window in later examples at Ajanta, Nasik, etc. The Chaitya-hall on the Manmodi hill is said to belong to the period of the Western Satrap ruler Nahapana, as is the case for the Great Chaitya at Karla Caves.

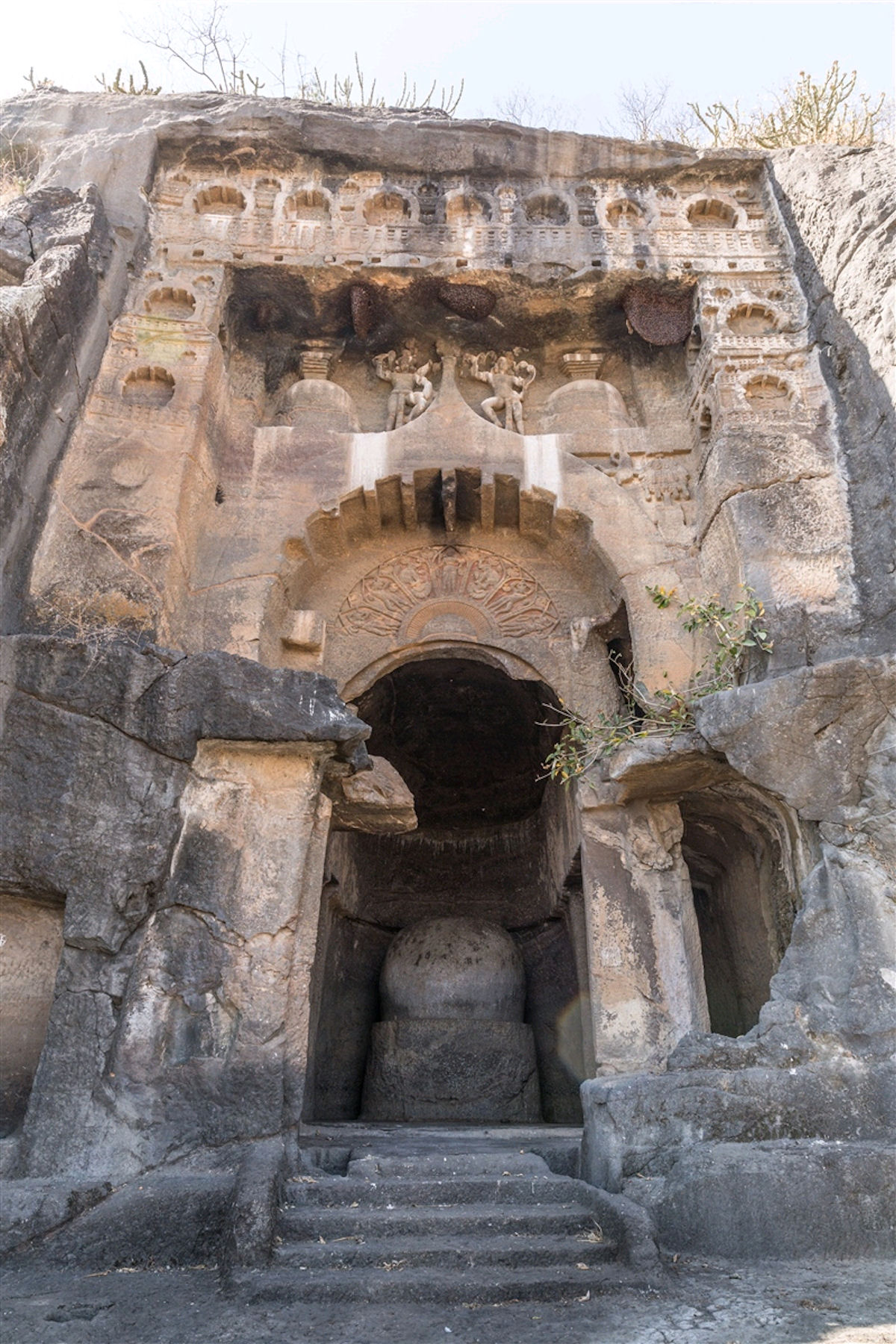
The Chaitya today.

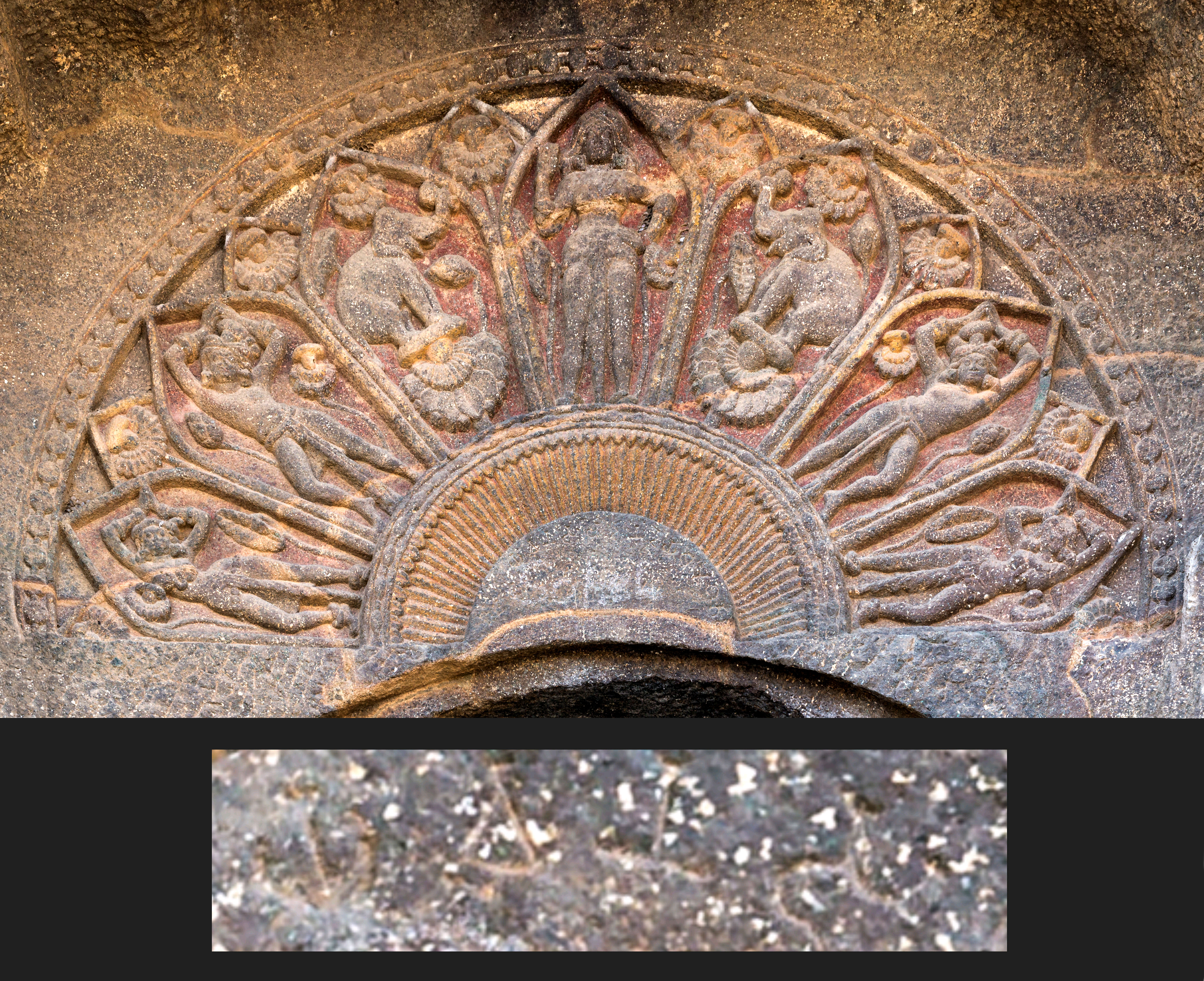
The façade of the Chaitya Hall was donated by a Yavana, according to the inscription on the central flat surface of the lotus (yavanasa Chaṁdānaṁ deyadhama gabhadā[ra]). Detail of the "Ya-va-na-sa" portion in old Brahmi script:, circa 120 CE.

Over the opening of the entrance, the place usually occupied by the window is divided fan-wise into seven petal-shaped compartments with a semi-circular centre, round the edge of the inner member of which is an inscription, in one line, of Brahmi characters. This is an inscription by a Yavana donor, appearing on the central flat surface of the lotus over the entrance: it mentions the erection of a hall-front for the Buddhist Samgha, by a Yavana donor named Chanda:

"yavanasa Chaṁdānaṁ deyadhama gabhadā[ra]"

𑀬𑀯𑀦𑀲 𑀙𑀁𑀤𑀸𑀦𑀁 𑀟𑁂𑀬𑀥𑀫 𑀕𑀪𑀤𑀸𑀭

"The meritorious gift of the façade of the (gharba) hall by the Yavana Chanda"

— Inscription on the façade of the Manmodi Chaitya.

In the middle compartment of the larger semi-circle is a standing female figure with a lotus flower on each side, the next compartments have elephants standing on lotus flowers and holding water-jars, as so often represented beside the figures of Sri or Lakshmi on old Buddhist works. In the next compartment on each side stands a male figure, his hands joined over or in front of his head, doing puja towards the central figure; and in the two outer spaces are females in similar attitudes, with a lotus flower and bud beside each. The style of art in which the figure of Sri Lakshmi is here represented is so similar to that employed for the same purpose at Bharhut, that there can be little doubt that they are of about the same age. The material, however, in which they are executed, and their purposes are so different, that it would be impossible, from that alone, to say which of the two is the earliest.

Over and outside these the façade of the great arch projects, with ribs in imitation of wooden rafters under it. On each side the finial is a male figure: that on the left holds a chauri and has wings, and some animal's head above his jaunty turban; the other holds some object in his right hand, and behind each shoulder are two snake-heads with their tongues hanging out. Right and left of these are dagobas in high relief, but roughly formed; and on the right of the arch is a tree with objects hanging in it, but it has never been quite finished, parts being only outlined.

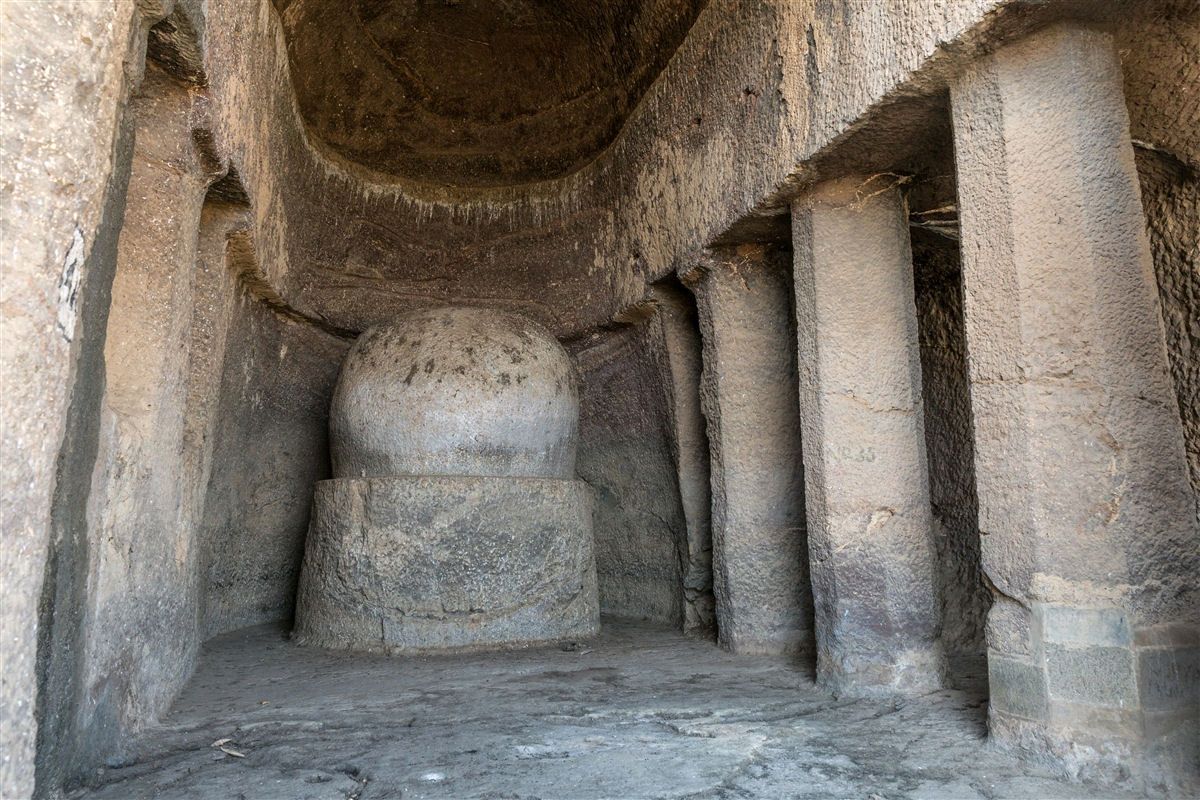
Inside of the Chaitya.

On the projecting frieze over all are seven Chaitya-window ornaments, with smaller ones between their finials, and two on the faces of each jamb. Inside the cave, three octagonal pillars on the right side are blocked out, as is also the dagoba, but without the capital. There is a horizontal soft stratum in the rock, which has probably led to the work being relinquished in its present unfinished state. This is very much to be regretted, as the whole design of this cave is certainly the most daring, though it can hardly be called the most successful, attempt on the part of the early cave architects to emancipate themselves from the trammels of the wooden style they were trying to adapt to lithic purposes.

At Barabar in the Lomas Rishi they only introduced elephants and trellis work, which we know from the Sanchi gateways were probably executed in wood and could easily have been so introduced. It would, however, have been very difficult to execute such a seven-leafed flower as this, in pierced work, even in wood, but it was an artistic mistake to introduce it above the real constructive opening, on a false front, as is done in this instance. The system here begun was afterwards carried to an extreme issue in the Gandhara monasteries, where figures were introduced everywhere, and the architecture only used as a frame such as we employ for pictures. Though its employment here is a solecism, this bas- relief is one of the most interesting pieces of sculpture for the history of the art, to be found in the whole range of the western caves.

==== Buddhist cells ====
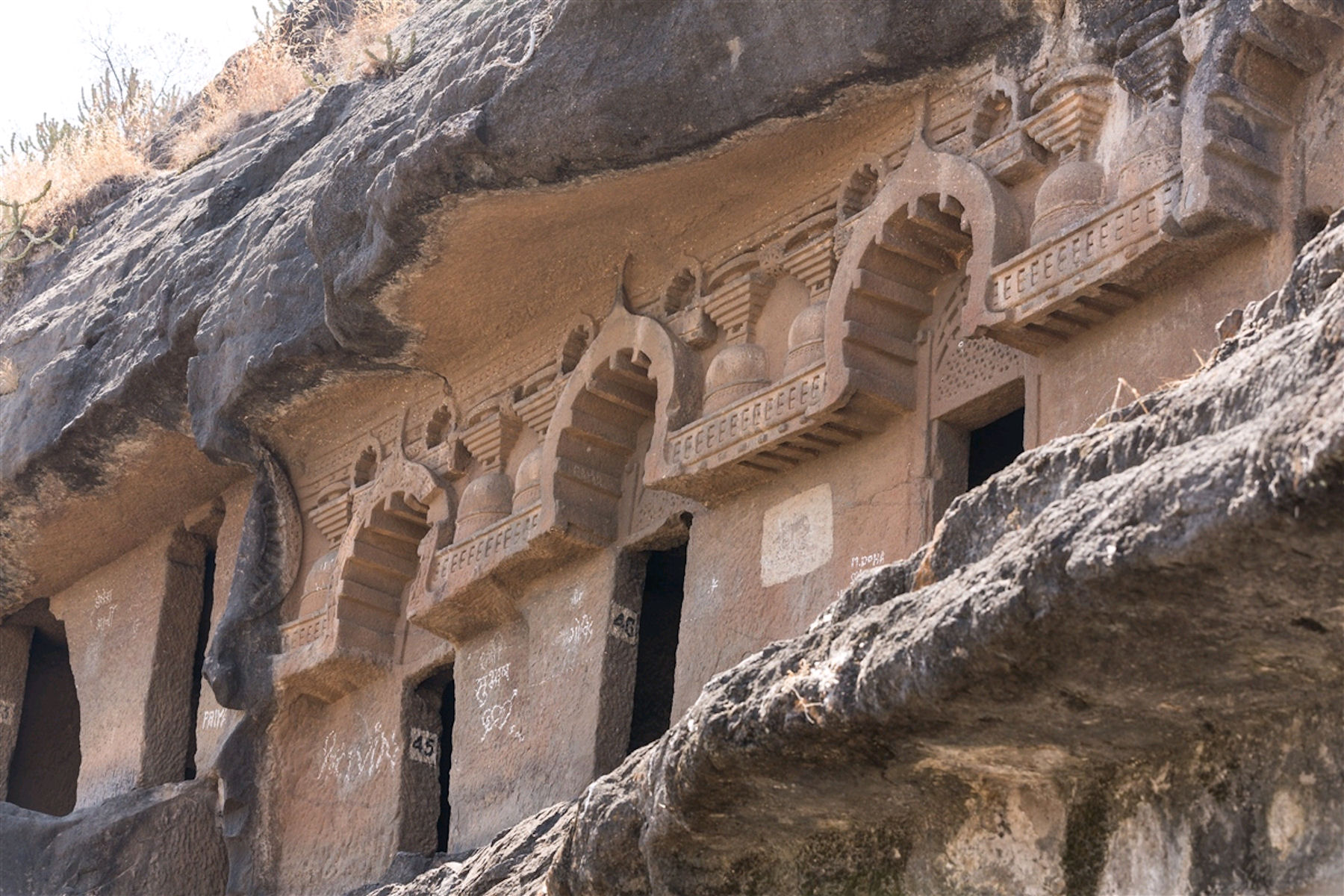
The Buddhist cells with individual Chaitya-window arches.

Higher up the rock, on the east or left side of this, are four cells with neatly-carved façades, each door having a Chaitya-window arch over it, projecting about 15 inches; and between the arches are two dagobas with chhatris in half relief; while over the shoulder of each arch is a smaller one as an ornament, and the Buddhist-rail pattern along the tops. There is one plain cell beyond these, and under the five are some others filled up with earth; while rather higher up on the east are four more. Under these latter is a vihara with two cells in the back and two in the left or east side, but the front is gone. It communicates by a passage with another to the west of it, nearly filled up with mud, and west of the Chaitya-cave are two small cells high up in the rock.

=== Amba-Ambika group of caves ===
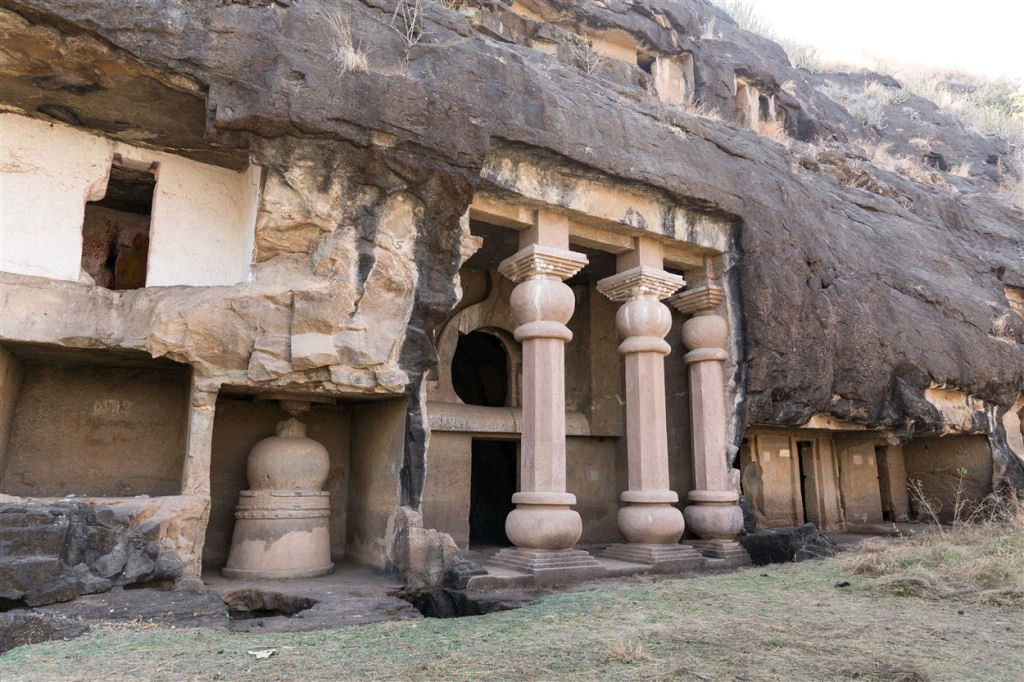
The Amba-Ambika group of caves.

Near the south-east end of the hill is the second group, consisting of an unfinished Chaitya-cave and a number of ruined cells and viharas (19.1858°N 73.8843°E). This Chaitya-cave is somewhat on the plan of the Bedsa one, that is, it has two octagonal columns in front, supporting the entablature above the great window. These columns are of the style occurring at the Ganesa Lena, with water-pot bases and capitals; but otherwise this cave is quite unfinished: the aisles have not been commenced; the capital of the dagoba is roughly blocked out, and portions of a square mass of rock from which to hew out the dome of it; but a great fault in the rock at the back of the cave seems to have stopped further operations.

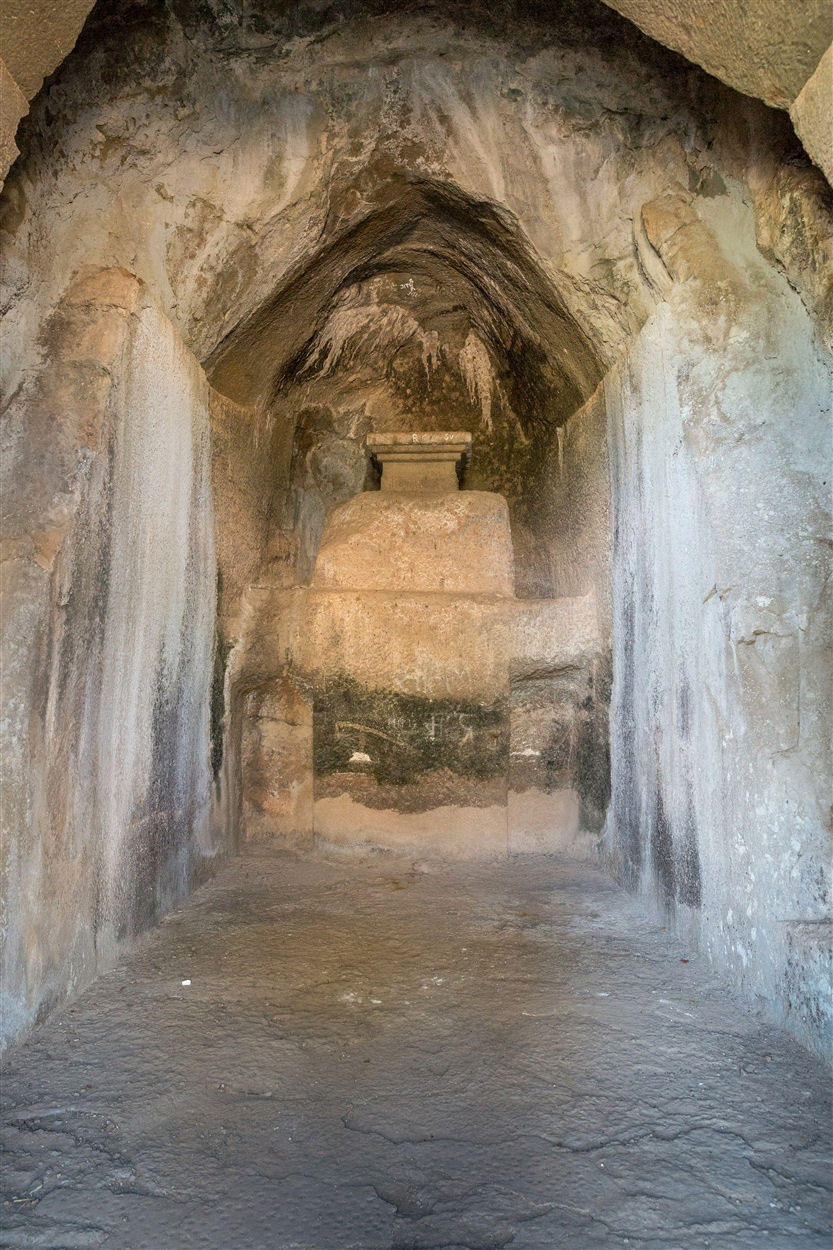
The Chaitya hall. Excavation was halted due to a major fault in the rock, that fills the cave with water in the rainy season.

The front is quite rough, but, if finished, would probably have been similar to the Bedsa Chaitya cave. It is almost covered with inscriptions, but from their positions and the roughness of the surfaces on which they are carved, it may naturally be inferred that they are only the work of visitors, perhaps long after the work was relinquished. Few of them can be made out with any certainty. The cave faces north by east, and the floor is much filled up with mud. At the east side of it is a cell, also deep in earth, in which is a dagoba, the chhatri or umbrella carved on the roof, but the staff has been broken, evidently with a view to convert it into the usual Saiva emblem.

==== Jainism Cells ====
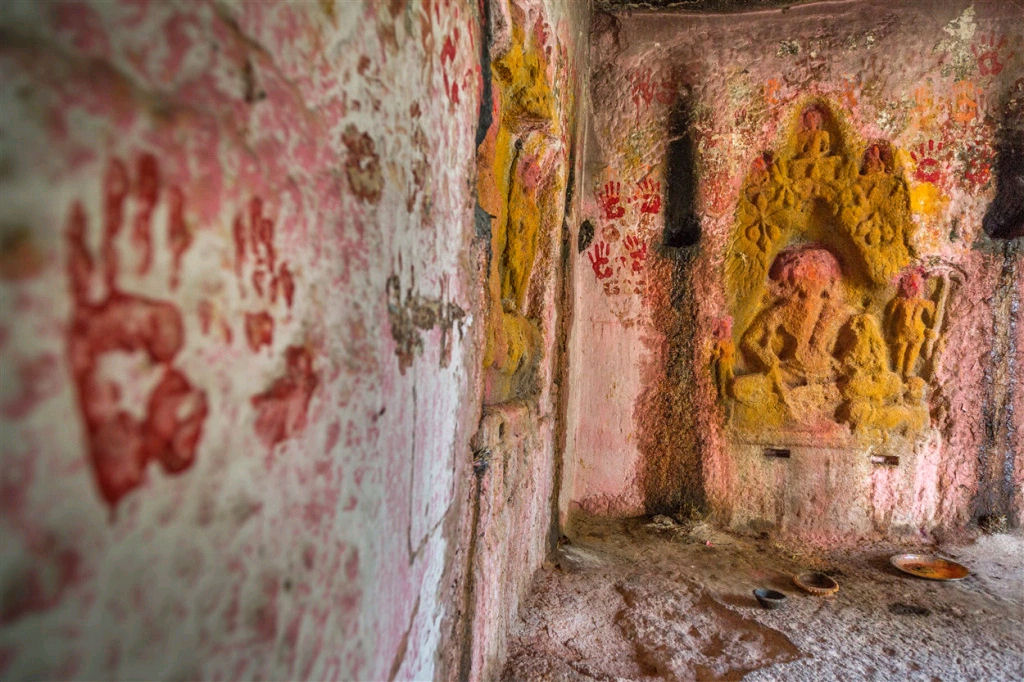
Paintings of Tirthankara in a cell of the second level.

There are portions of other cells, and a fragment of an inscription beside some modern steps leading up to five cells above. The two at the west end are converted into one by cutting away the partition, and on the walls are three defaced figures perhaps of Jain figures. This is dedicated to the goddess Ambika also the sasanadevi or patron goddess of the 23rd Tirthankara Neminatha. Here Brahmans worship the mutilated image of Jain as a Shiva goddess.

In the outer wall of another of these cells there have been a standing (Kayotsarga) and a sitting figure of Tirthankara, but these are now almost obliterated.

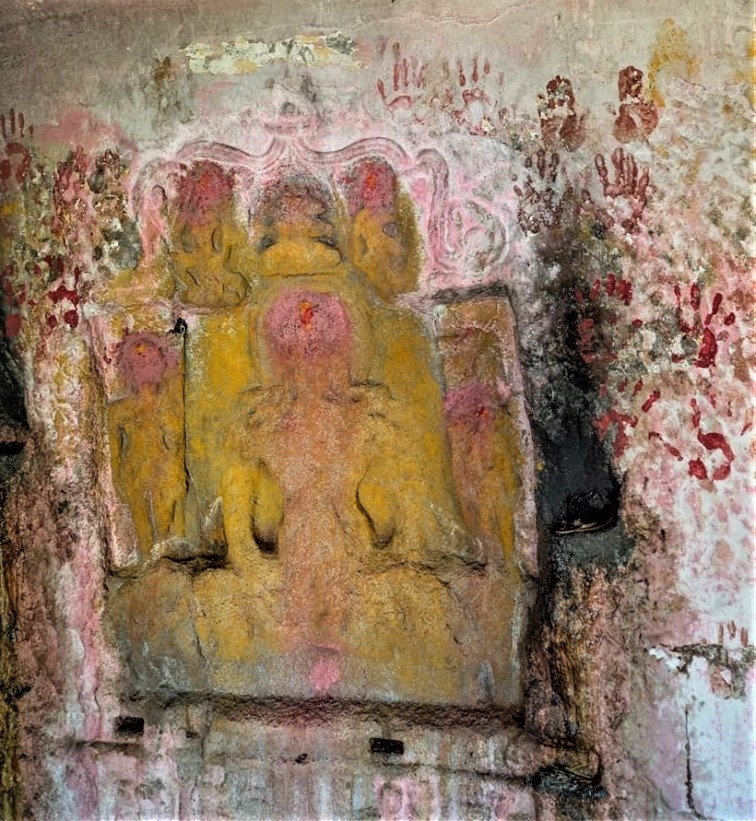
Jain TIrthankara Image

=== Bhimasankar group of caves ===
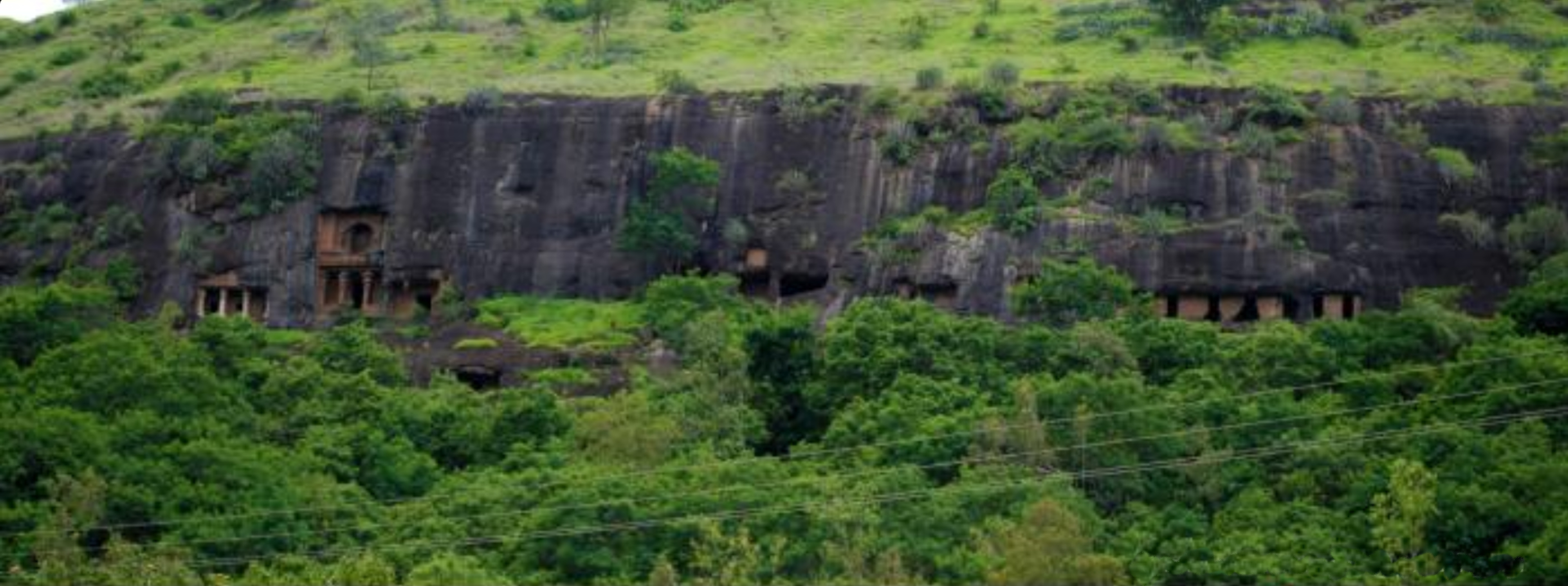
The Bhimasankar group of caves.

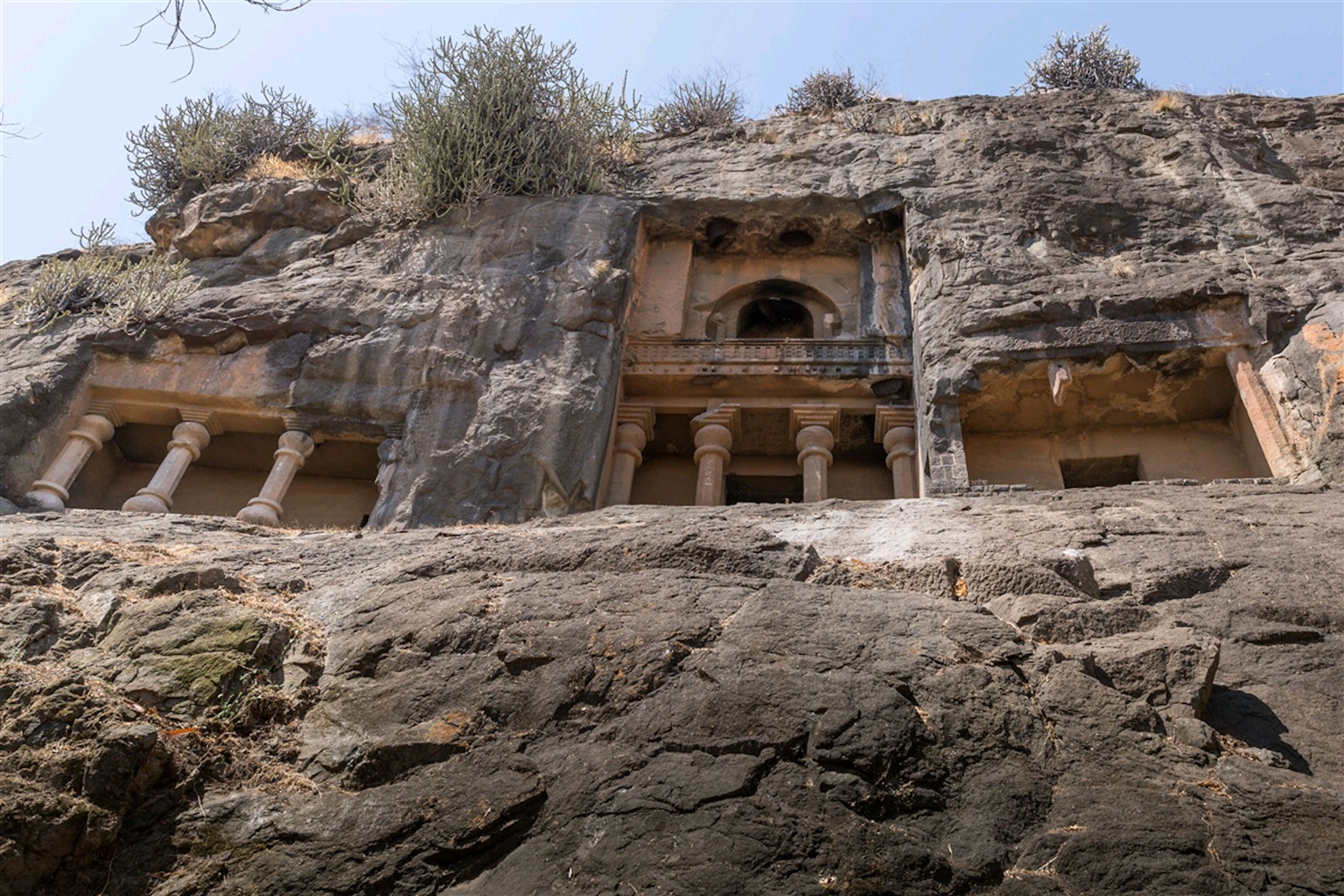
Part of the Bhimasankar group of caves.

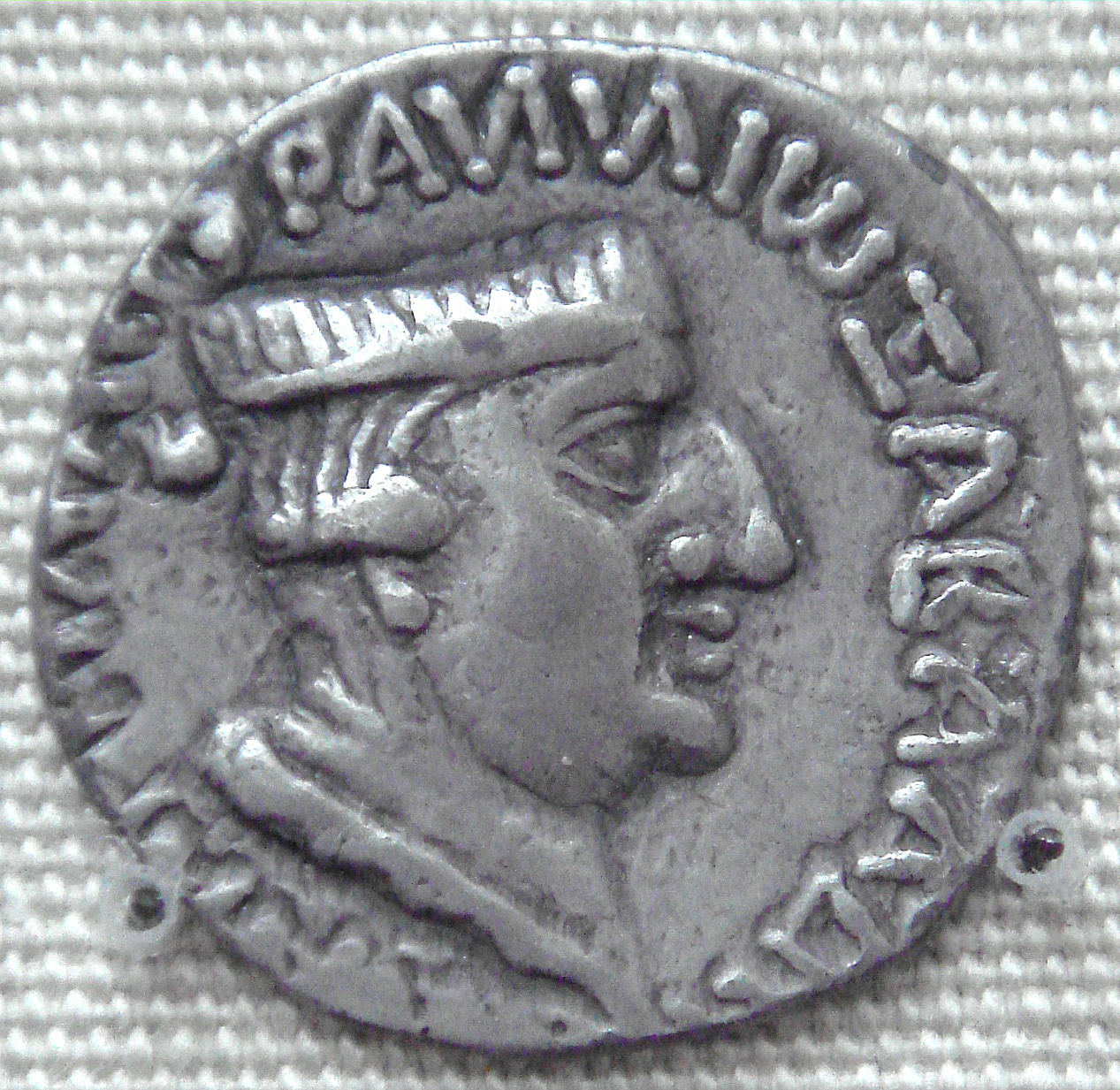
A minister of Western Satraps ruler Nahapana contributed to the constructions in Manmodi Caves, circa 124 CE.

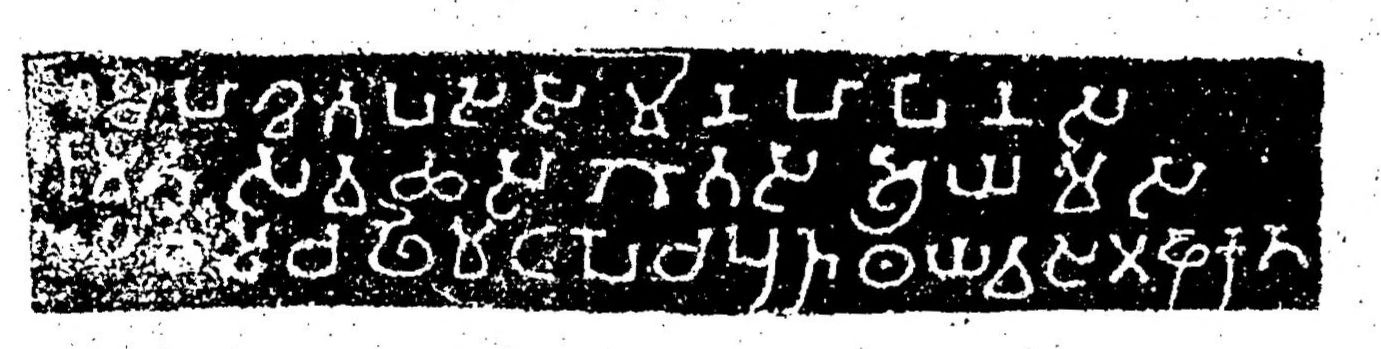
The Nahapana inscription.

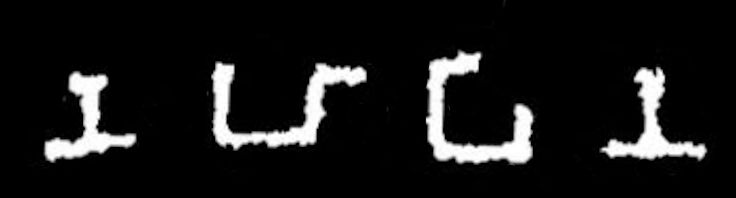
The name "Nahapāna" (𑀦𑀳𑀧𑀸𑀦) in Brahmi in the Nahapana inscription.

The third group is round a comer of the hill to the south-east of these last, and at a considerably higher level, some of them almost inaccessible (19.1803°N 73.8870°E). The first reached is a recess over a cell or cistern, with an inscription:

Sivasamaputasa Simtabhati ? no deyadhama pati.
"For a pious gift of charity, from Simtabhati, son of Sivasarman"

A little beyond this, on the left side of a recess over the side of a water cistern, is another inscription in three lines, of which, however, the first letters are obliterated; still it is possible make out that it was [constructed by] "Ayama, the minister of Mahakshatrapa Svami Nahapana." This inscription bears a Saka era date of year 46, which is 124 CE. The inscription is located in the fourth excavation on the eastern side of Manmodi Hill, in Cave 7. After passing a cistern and two small recesses, there is another recess with a bench round three sides, on the left side wall of which is the inscription. It is one of the most important of the series as the only one containing a royal name, that of Nahapana, which can also be found at Nasik Caves and at Karla Caves. It is in three lines about 4 feet long. The first few letters in each line are considerably decayed and faint. It reads:

[Raño]jmahākhatapasa sāminahapānasa

[Ā]mātyasa Vachhasagotasa Ayamasa
[de]yadhama cha [po?] ḍhi maṭapo cha puñathaya vase 46 kato

"The meritorious gift of a mandapa and cistern by Ayama of the Vatsa-gotra,
Prime Minister to the king, the great Satrap, the Lord Nahapana, made for merit, in the year 46."

— Inscription of Nahapana, Manmodi Caves.

Scrambling along the face of a precipice to the south, one can reach first a small vihara without cells or carving, then another cave with two octagonal pillars in the front of the verandah, and two engaged ones at the ends rising from a bench. The door is 5 feet 10 inches wide, and reaches to the roof of the hall, which has been frescoed. The back of the seat or low screen in front of the veranda is carved outside with the rail ornament; the columns are of the usual Nasik pattern, but without animal figures above: over them the frieze projects considerably, and is carved in the style of Cave 4 at Nasik, the ends of the rafters projecting on the lower fascia, and the upper being carved with rail pattern. Over this is a recess some 2 or 3 feet deep, with the Chaitya arch over it, but without any carving.

The hall is 33 feet deep, and about 12 feet wide; but at the back stands a mass of rock over 8 feet wide by 5.5 thick, with a squatting figure roughly sketched out on the front of it. This mass is very rotten behind, and at the left side of it is a well of excellent water.

The other caves here are small and uninteresting.

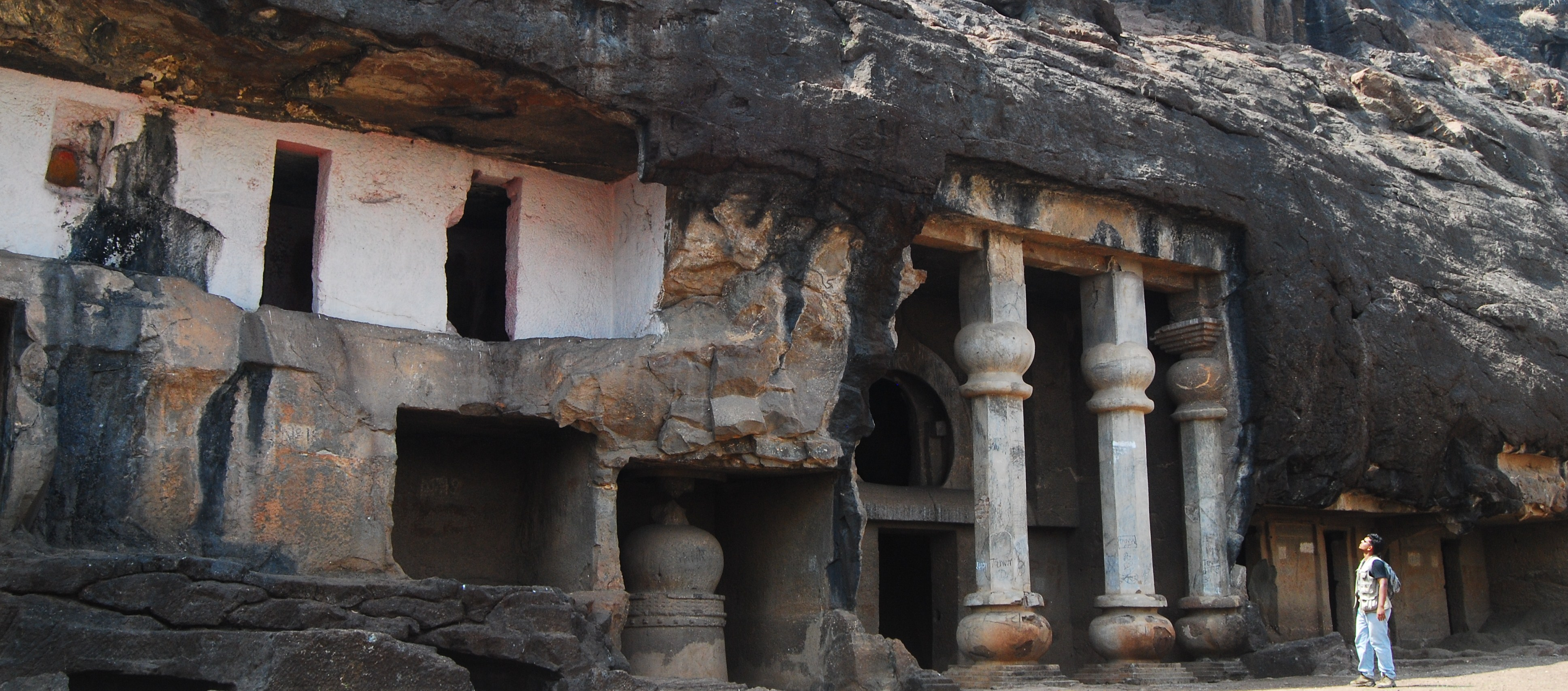
Manmodi Caves Ambika Group

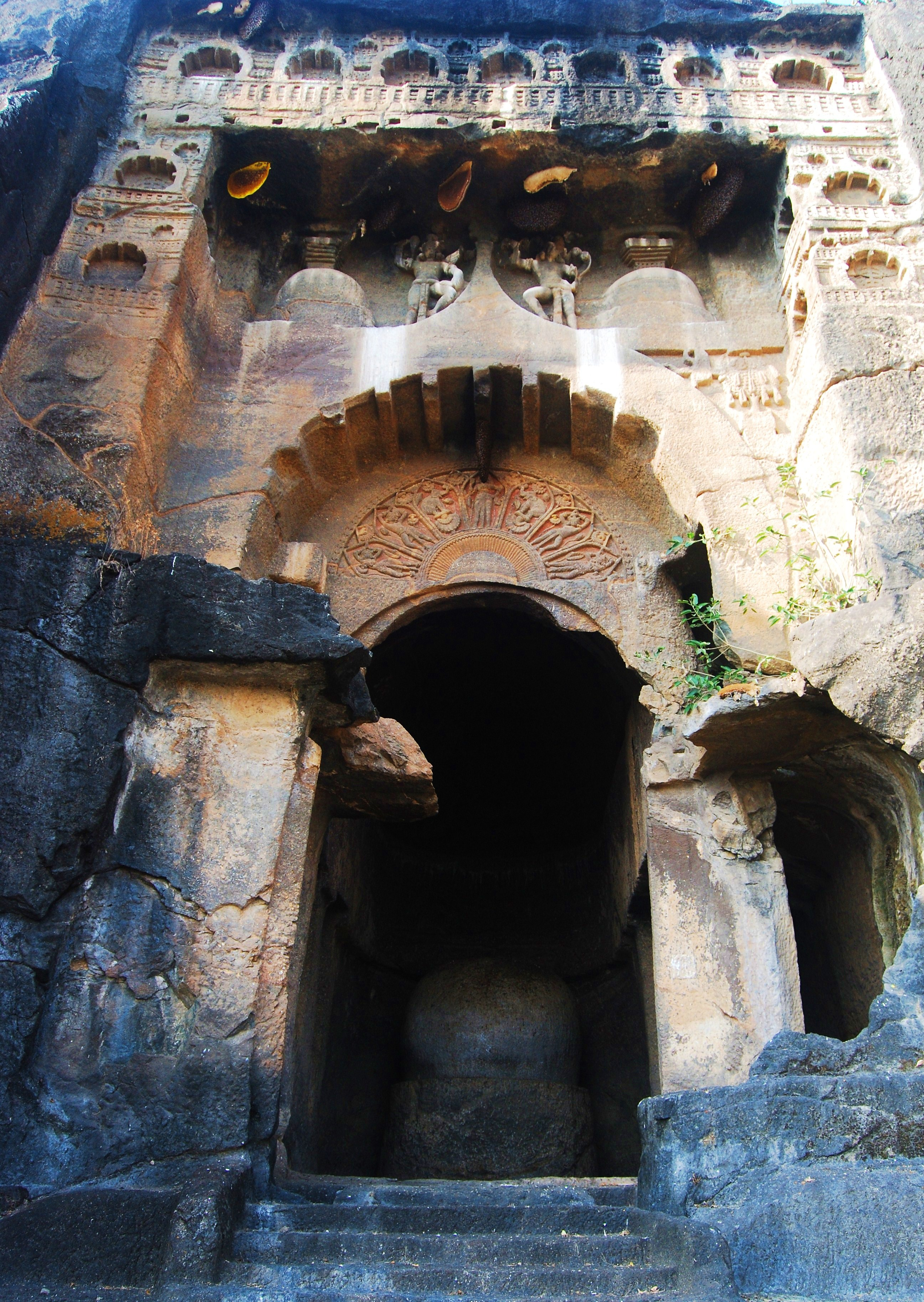
Manmodi Caves – Bhootleni Chaitya

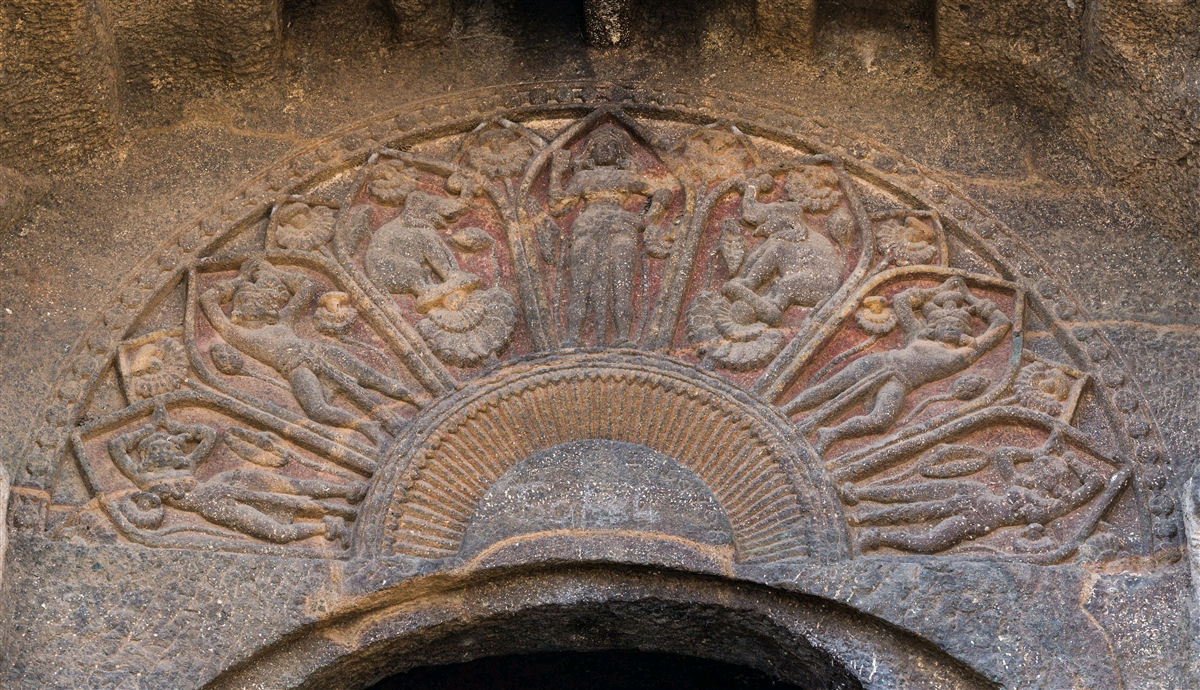
Manmodi Chaitya Hall facade medallion

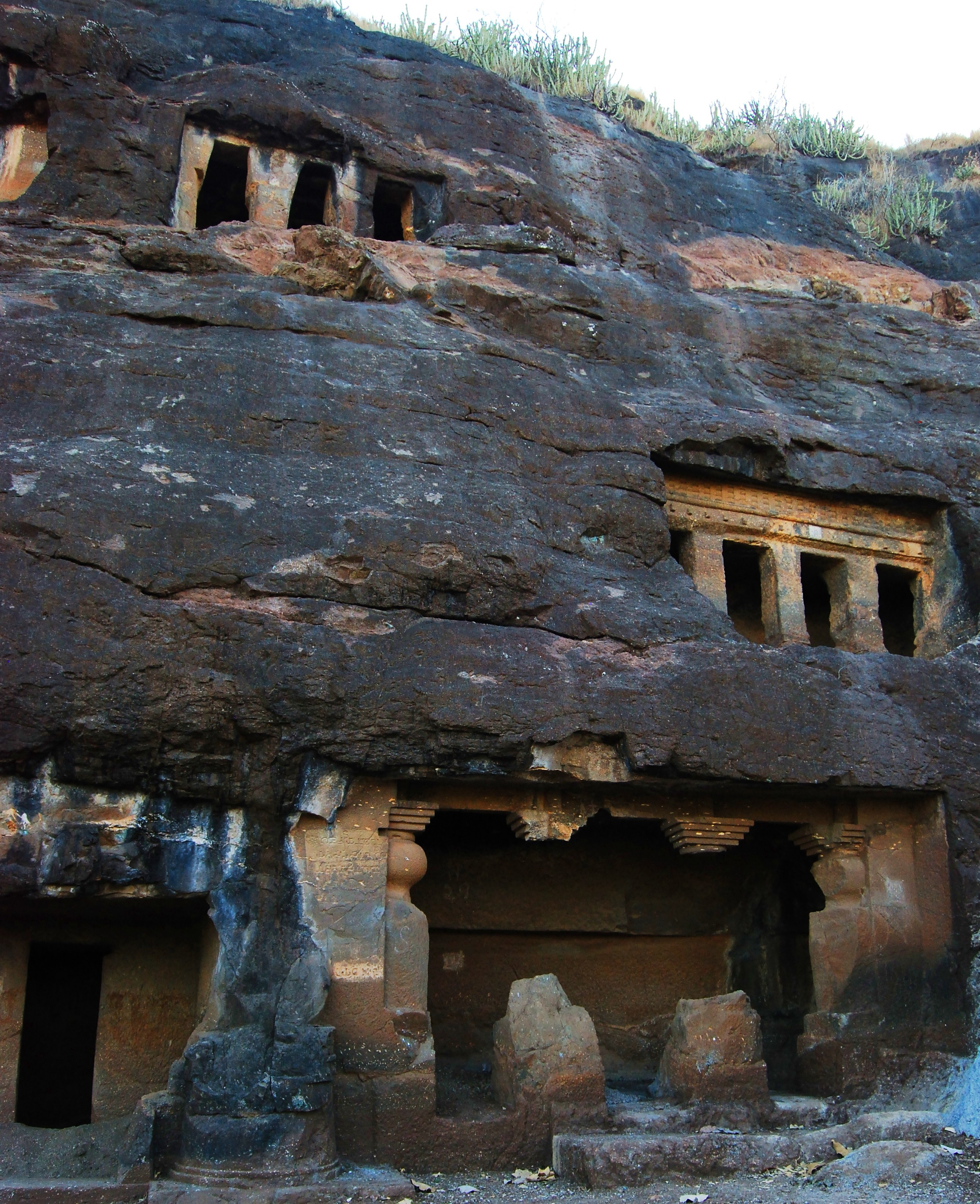
Manmodi Caves Two story Vihara

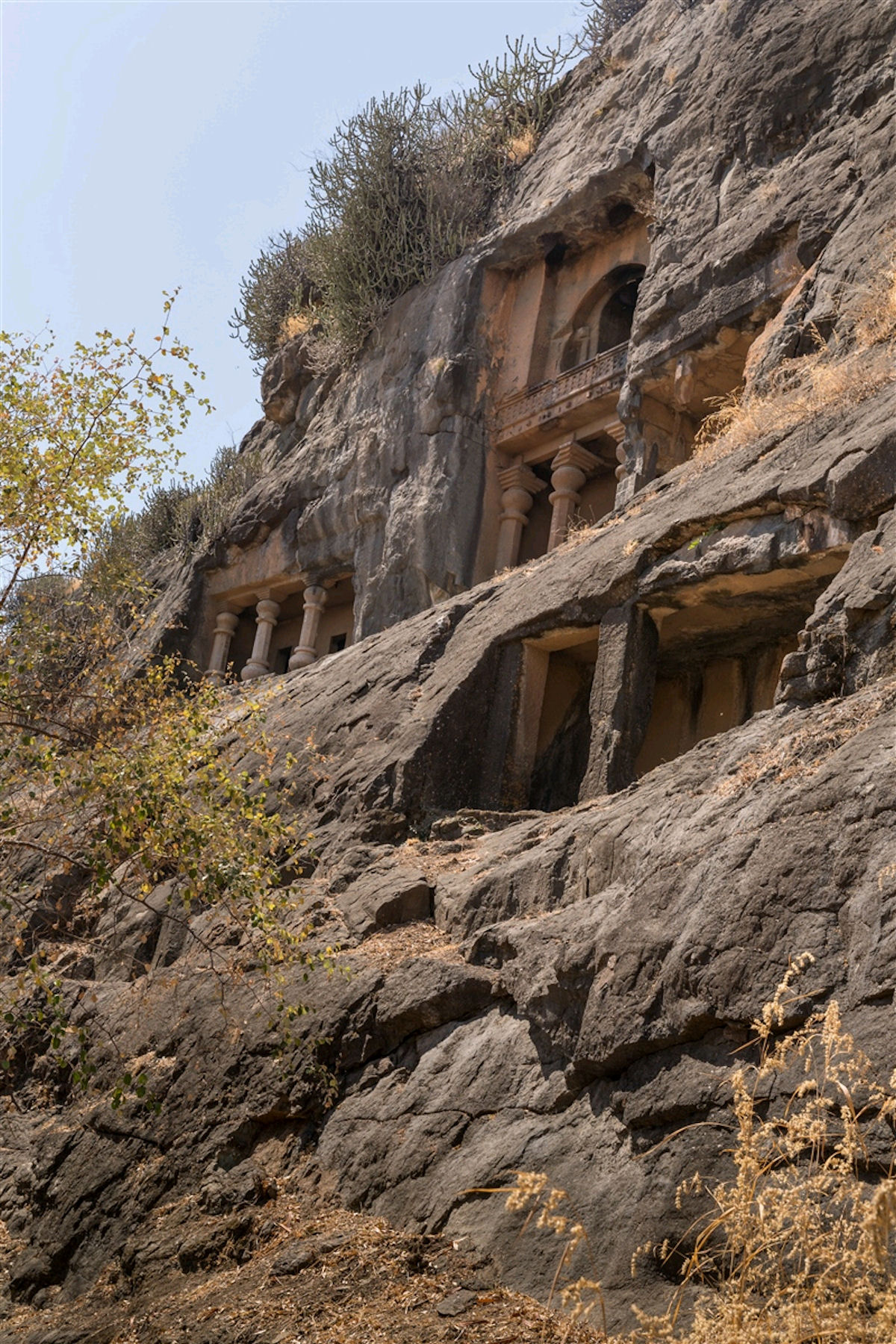
The Bhimashankar caves

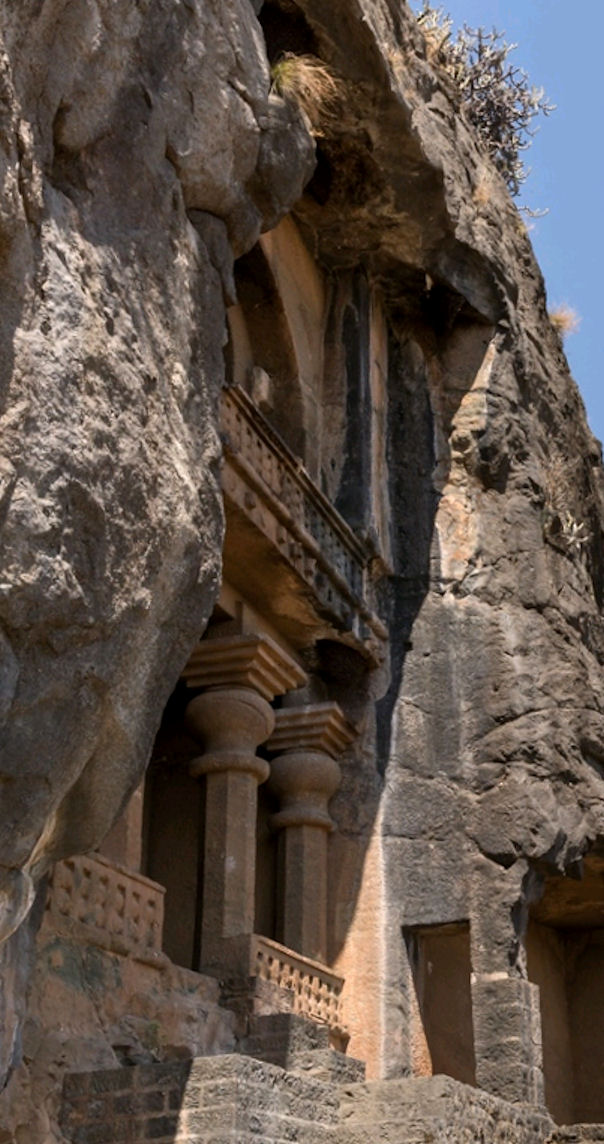
The Chaitya of Bhimasankar group
