= Tulja Caves =

Cave in Maharashtra, India

Tulja Lena caves
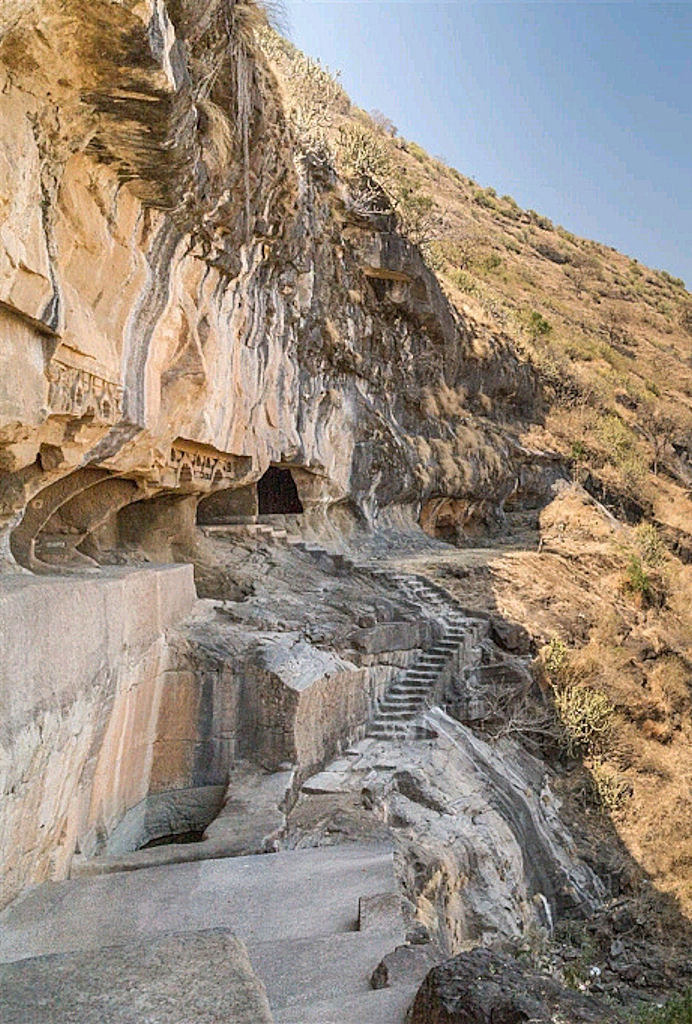
- Tulja Lena caves

- Location within India
- Location: Junnar
- Coordinates: 19.2083°N 73.8356°E
- Geology: Basalt

Tulja Caves (Tulja Lena) are located beyond the Shivneri hill, about 4 km to the west of Junnar, India. Other caves surrounding the city of Junnar are: Manmodi Caves, Shivneri Caves and Lenyadri caves.

The cave has circular Chaitya hall surrounded by twelve octagonal pillars around Stupa. These caves are one of the earliest caves of Junnar, excavated around 50 B.C. This Buddhist cave group consist of 14 cave. Cave No 4 is used as a temple of goddess Tulja Devi.

== Description ==
The Tulja Lena caves lie in a hill about a mile and a half or two miles north-west from Junnar, beyond the north end of Sivaneri hill. They owe their name to a shrine of Tulja Devi, a form of Bhavani, the consort of Shiva (see Tulja Bhavani Temple).

The caves run along the face of the cliff nearly from south-east to north-west, facing about south-west, but all the façades have fallen away. They consist of a number of cells and two small viharas, with a Chaitya cave of a form quite unique. It is circular in plan, 25 feet 6 inches across, with a dagoba in the centre, 8 feet 2 inches in diameter, surrounded by twelve plain octagonal shafts 11 feet in height, supporting a dome over the dagoba. The surrounding aisle is roofed by a half arch rising from the wall to the upper side of an architrave 7 or 8 inches deep over the pillars.

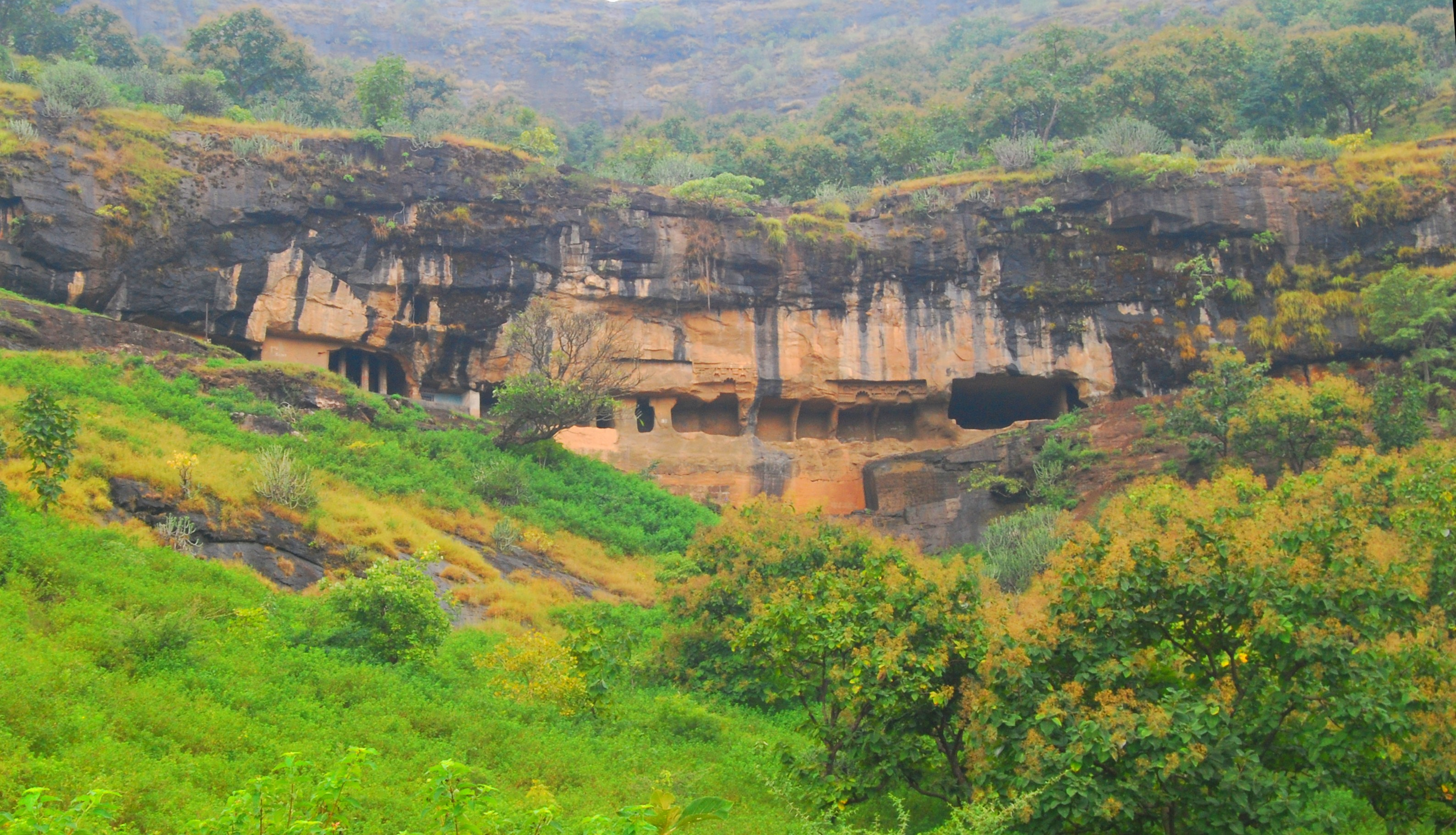
Tulja Caves from a distance.

The dagoba is perfectly plain, but its capital has been hewn off to convert it into a huge linga of Shiva, and even the dome is much hacked into, while some of the pillars have been notched and others broken.

In front of this cave and the one on each side of it is a platform built by the modern devotees of Tulja Devi.

Over the front of one of the cells to the north-east of this are left some Chaitya-window ornamentation, a larger one over where the door has been, the inner arch of which is filled with knotted ribbons etc..., similar to what is over the Chaitya-cave door at the Nasik Caves, while the front of the arch is carved with flowers. On each side of this is a smaller arch; and farther to the left is a dagoba in half relief with the umbrella or chhatri over it, on each side a Gandharva or Kinnara above, and a male figure below, that to the right attended by a female, but all of them weatherworn. Over all is a projecting frieze carved on front with the "Buddhist rail pattern".

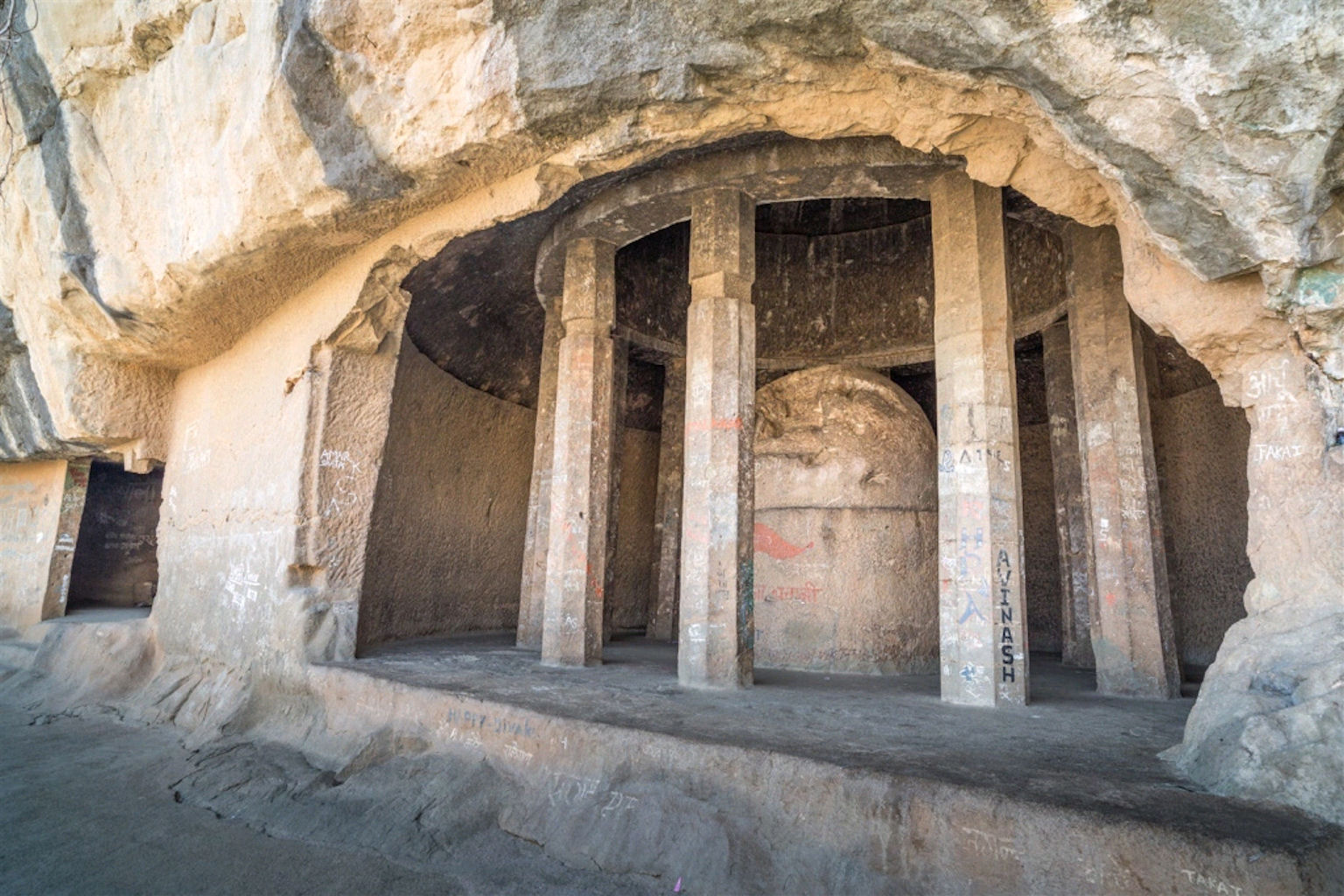
Remains of the circular Chaitya.

Next to these are two more plain fronts, and then two with Chaitya-window heads over where the doors have been, and smaller ones between, and the "rail ornament" and quadrantal carved roll supported by slender brackets in entire relief, as at the Bhaja Caves.

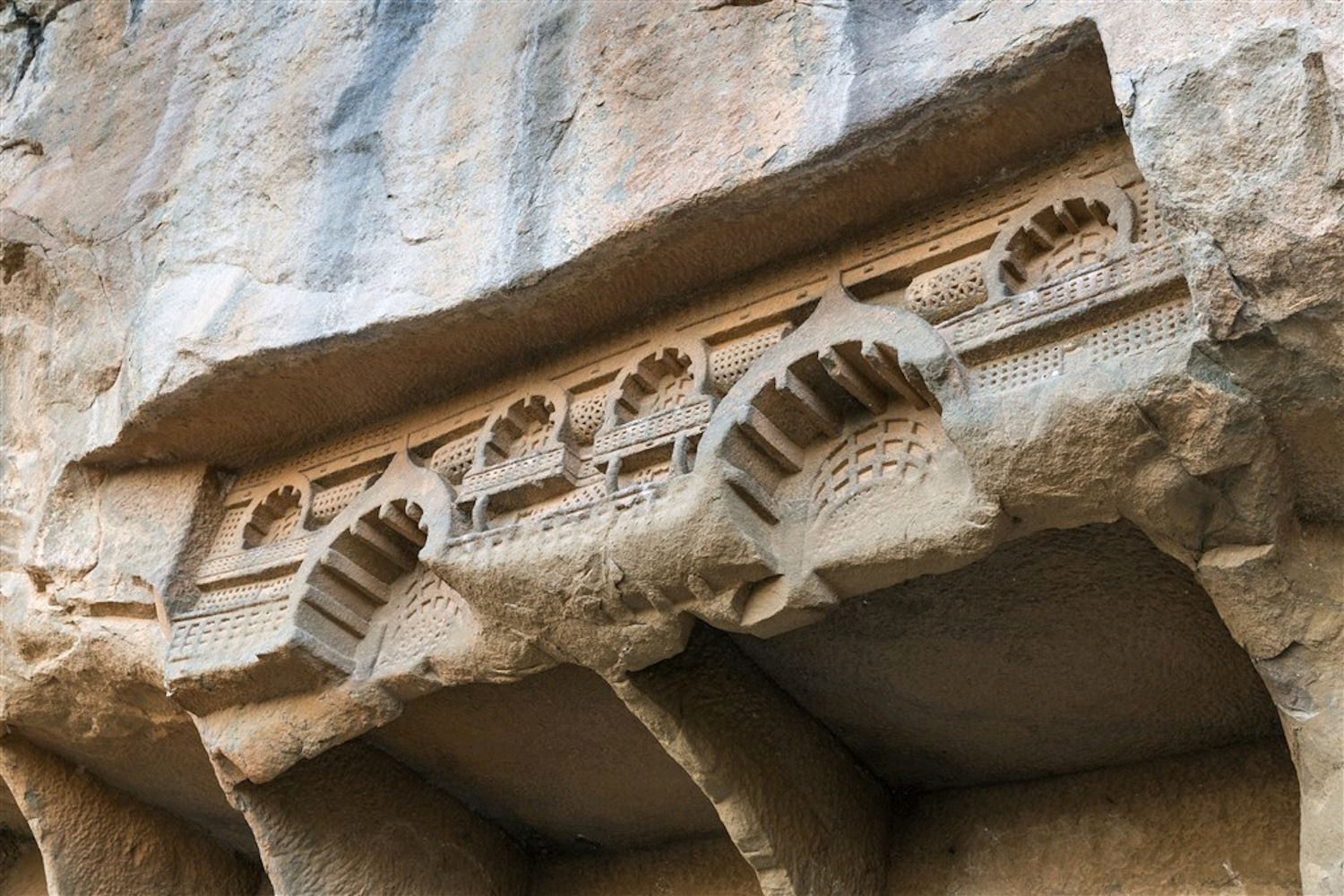
Tulja Lena Chaitya window decorations.

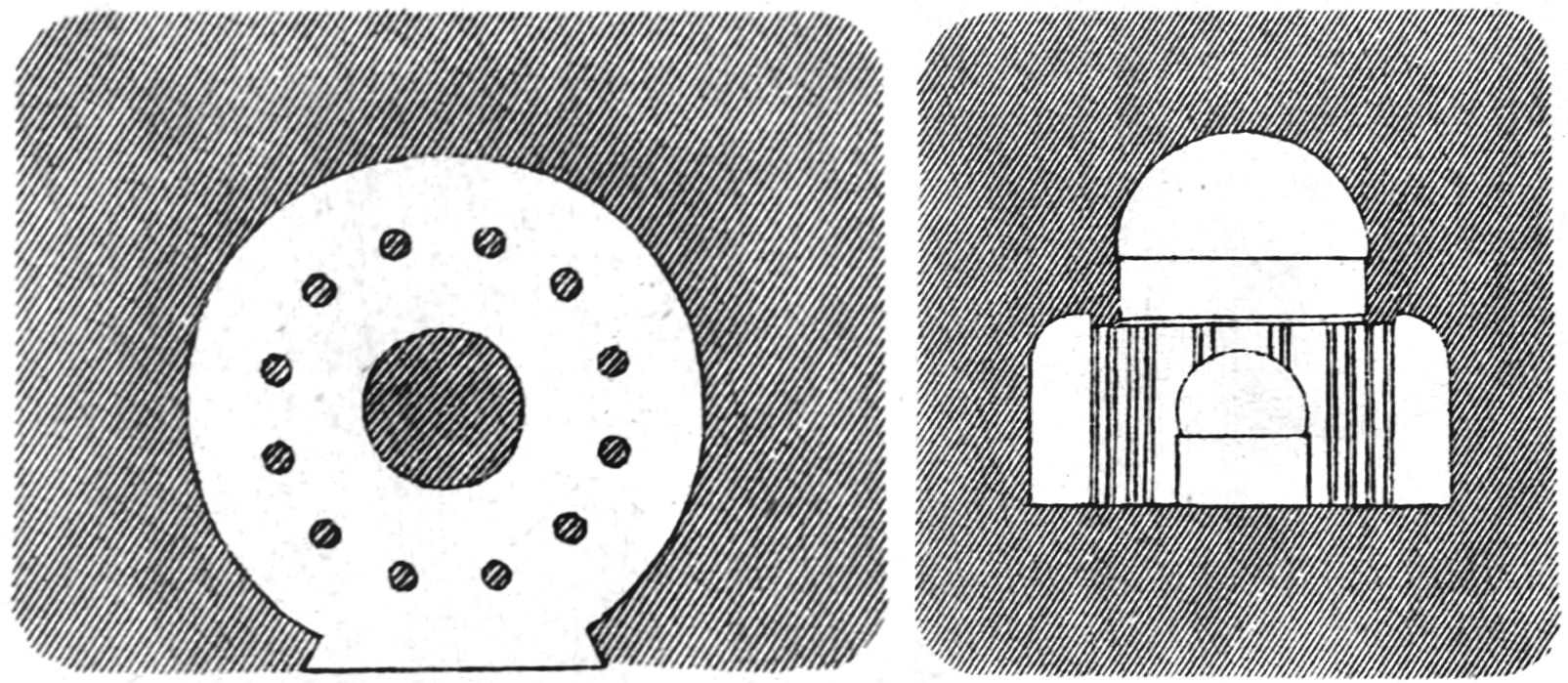
Tulja Lena Chaitya, plan and elevation.

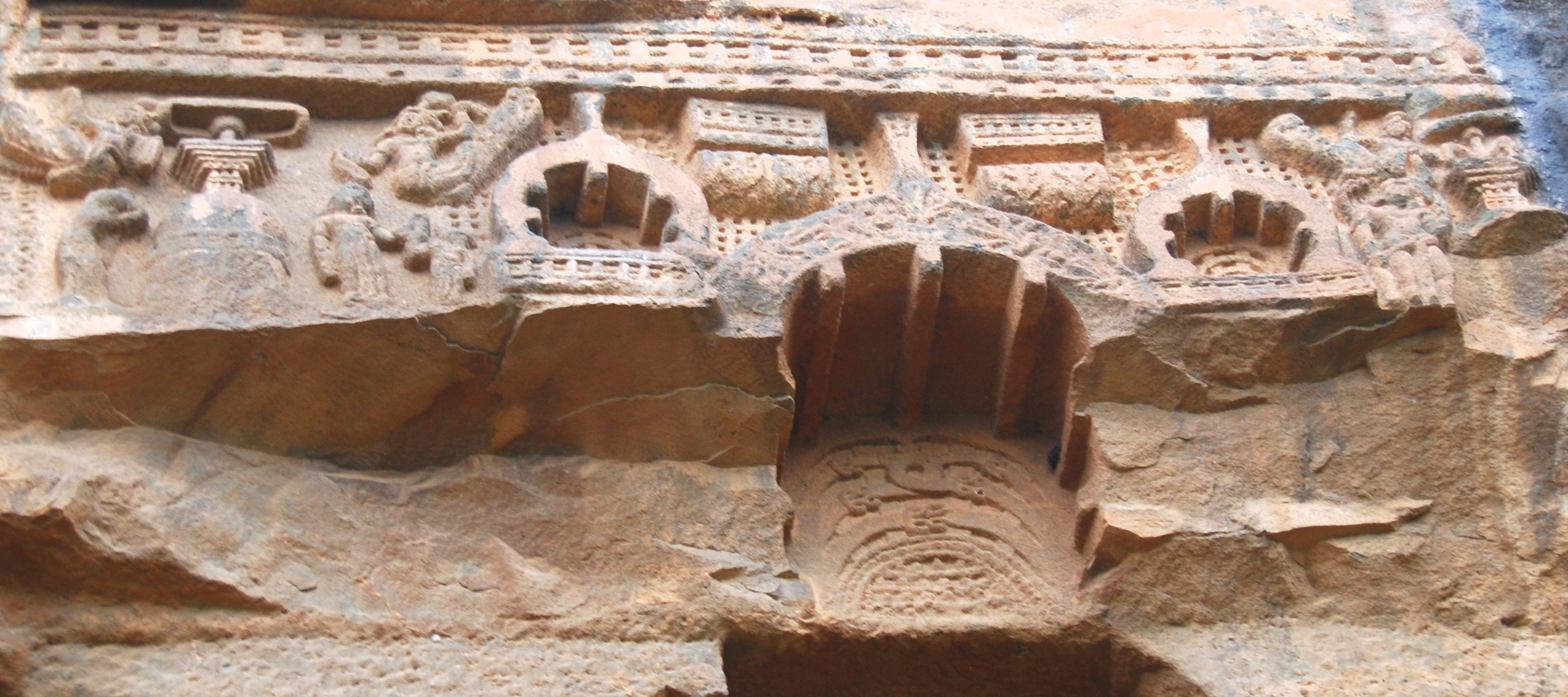
Tulja Caves detailed carvings

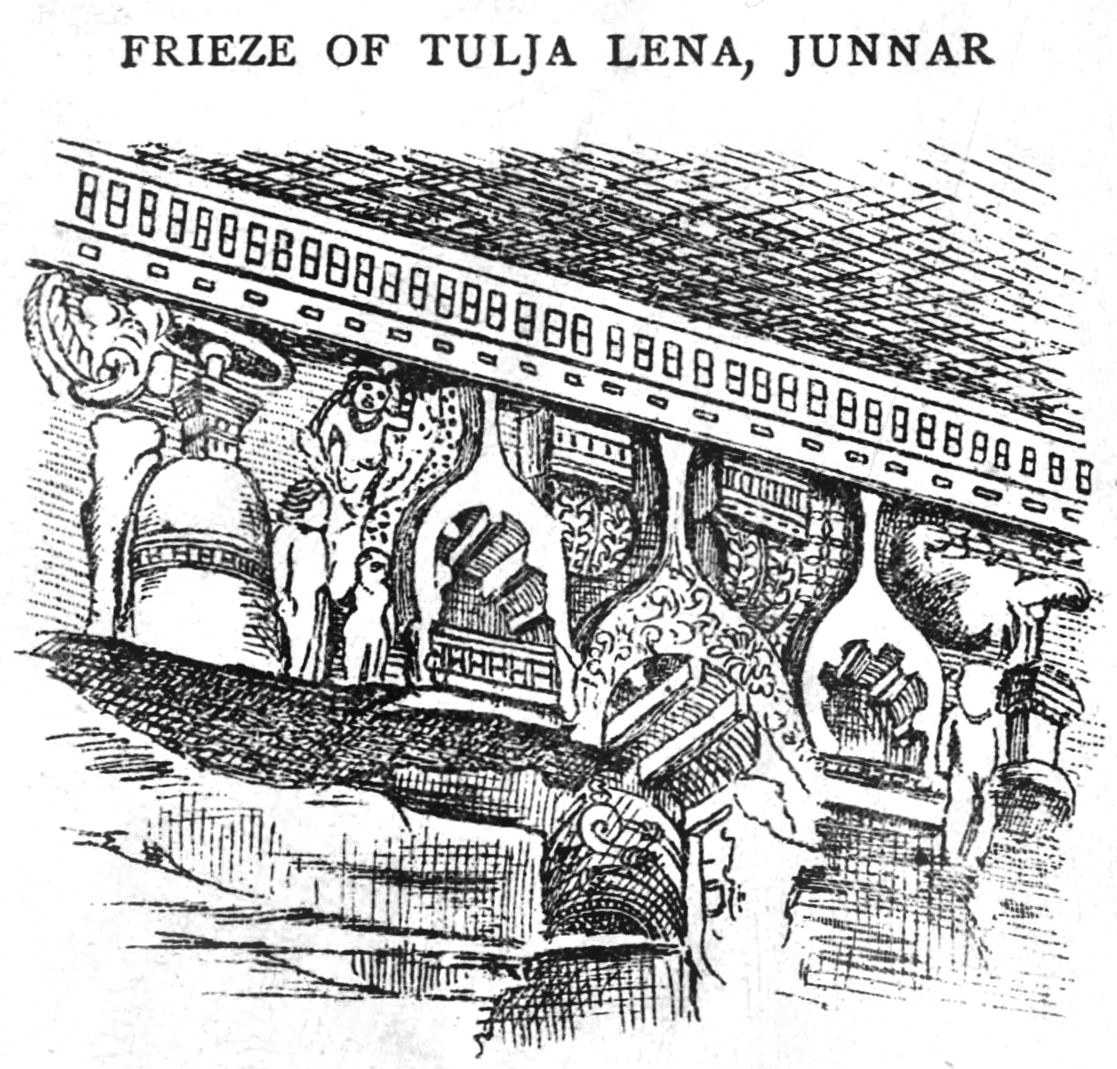
A frieze at Tulja Lena.
