= Alang Fort =

Indian fort

- Nashik district, Maharashtra in India
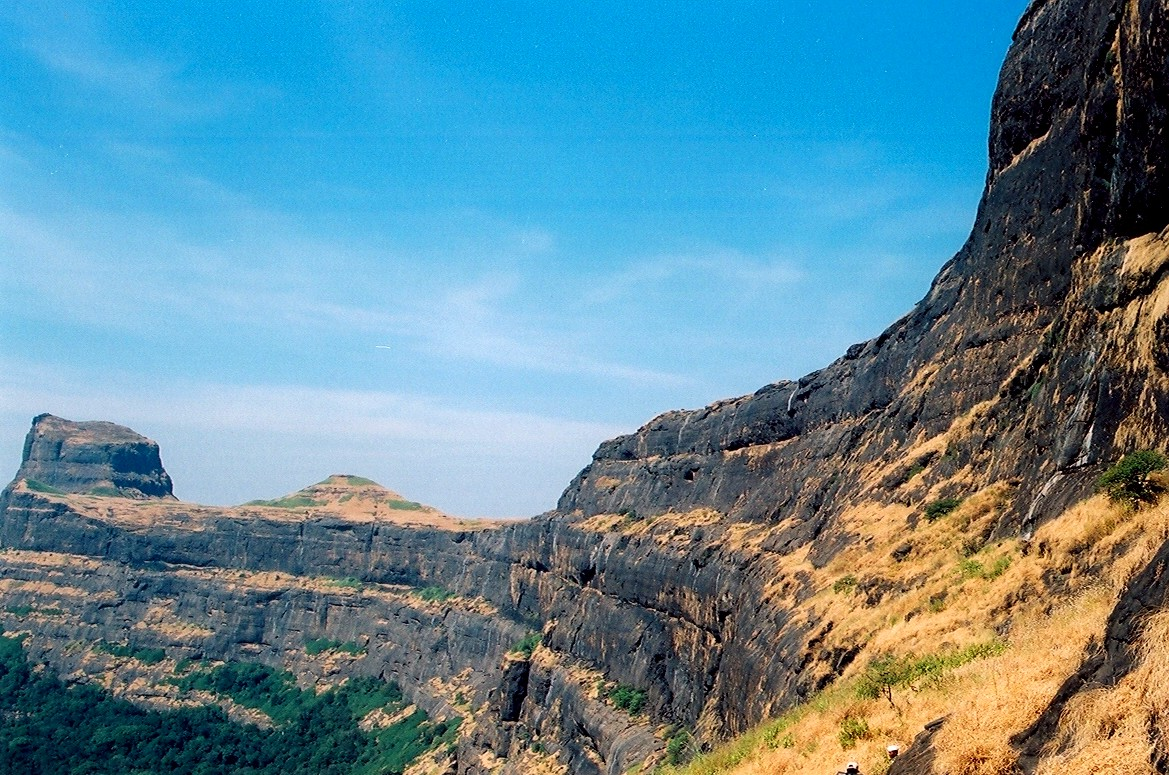
- Alang Fort

Site information
- Type: Hill Fort
- Owner: Government of India
- Open to the public: Yes
- Condition: Poor

Location
- Shown within Maharashtra
- Coordinates: 19.5827°N 73.6612°E
- Height: 4,500 feet (1,400 m)

Site history
- Built: Maratha Empire
- Materials: Stone, Lead

Alang Fort (also known as Alangad or Alang) is a fort located in the Kalsubai range of the Western Ghats mountains, Nashik, (Maharashtra, India). Alang Fort, Madangad Fort, Kulang Fort, and the trek connecting them are known as Alang, Madan, and Kulang (AMK). Alang Fort is regarded as one of the most difficult places to reach in the region. As the Maharashtra Culture Government website notes, "Alang-Madan-Kurland is one of Maharashtra's most challenging treks, especially because of its challenging stretches of water and dense forests." This route is suitable for experienced mountaineers. While the forts are difficult to access because of heavy local rains and poorly marked trails, they remain a popular tourist destination.

The fort is situated on a large natural plateau. Inside the fort are two caves, a small temple, and 11 water cisterns. The two caves can accommodate up to 40 people. Remnants of historic buildings are spread throughout the fort. To the east of the fort lies Kalasubai, Aundh Fort, Patta, and Bitangad; to the north, Harihar, Trymbakgad, and Anjaneri, and to the south, Harishchandragad, Aajobagad, Khutta, and Ratangad.

Due to the remote nature of this trek, even experienced climbers are advised to carry sufficient amounts of food and water to sustain the round trip.

== Access ==
Access to Alang is via the village of Ambewadi — while Kasara or Igatpuri is reached by train or bus. There is a bus service from Ghoti to Ambevadi 32 kilometres (20 mi), available at 7:30 a.m, which takes around three hours to reach the fort. From Ambevadi, one can see Alang, Madan, and Kulang. The bus travels the ridge between Alang and Madan from where the fort is visible. To the left is Alang and to the right is Madan.

Alang fort is accessible from Ghatghar via Ghoti-Bhandardara. From there, in 2 1/2 hours, one can reach the third cavern by way of Bhandardara from Udadvade. Another way is by way of Bhandardara from Udadvade Gaon. It leads to the plateau, and then connects to the second route.

== Gallery ==
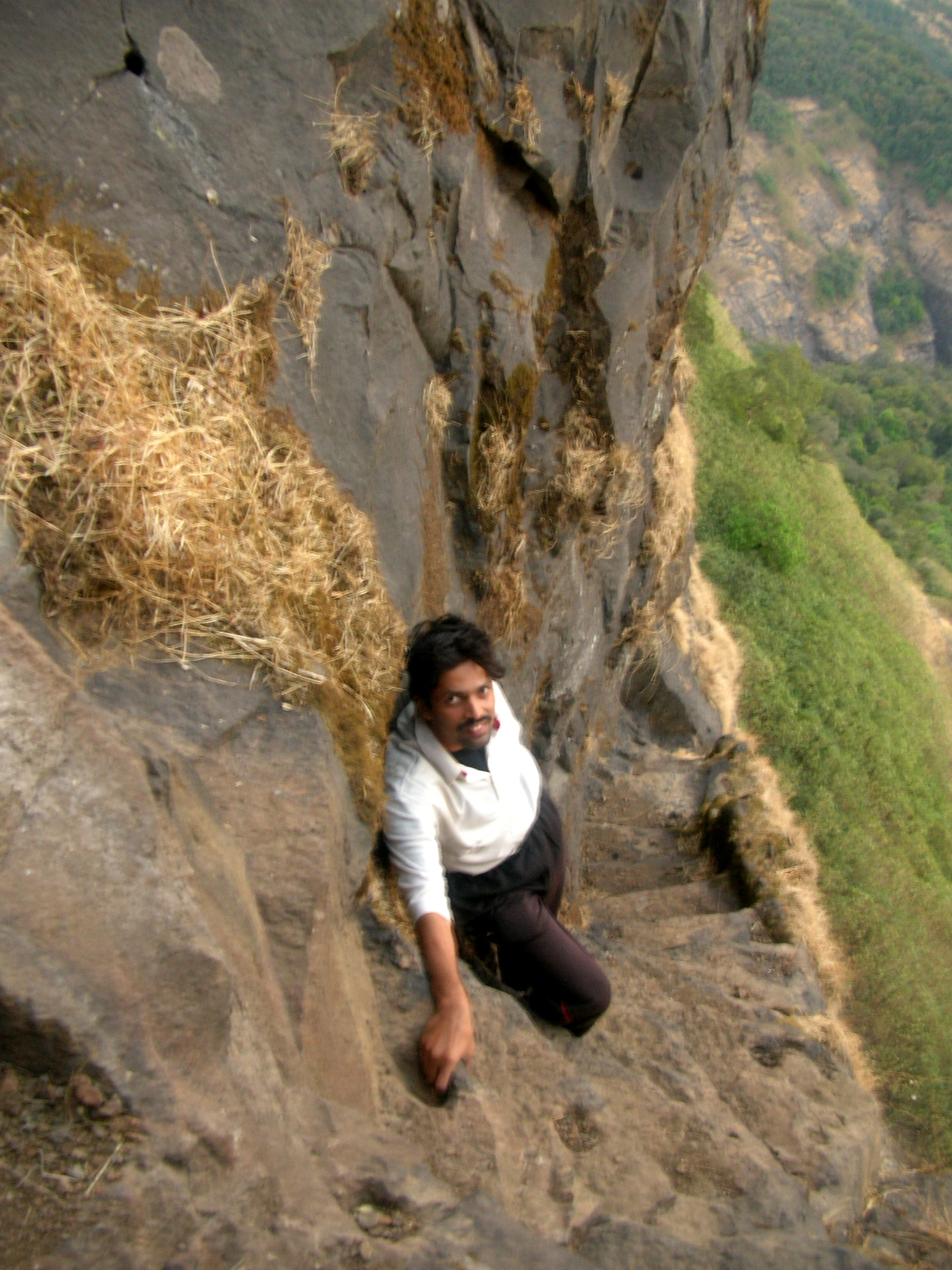

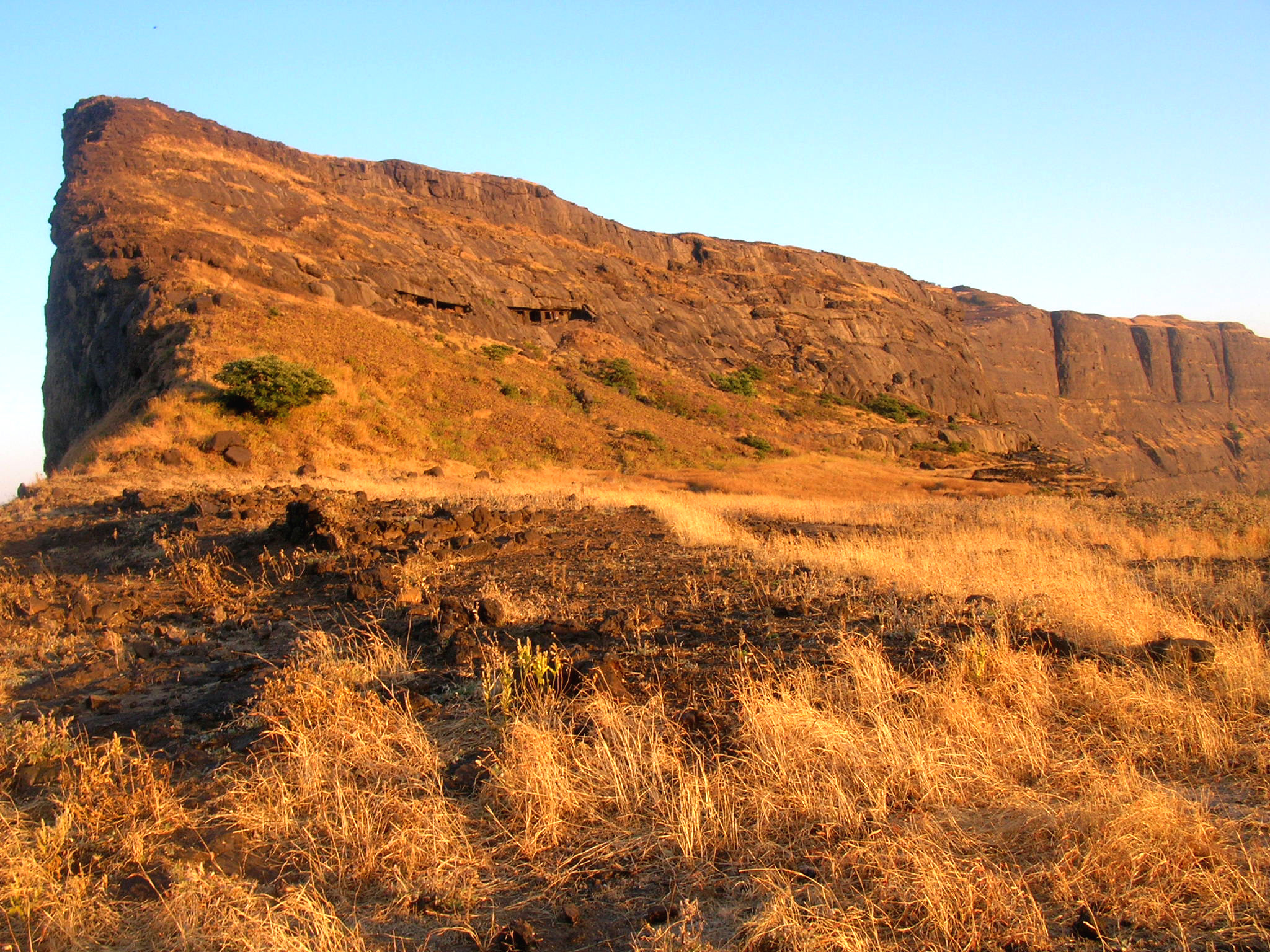

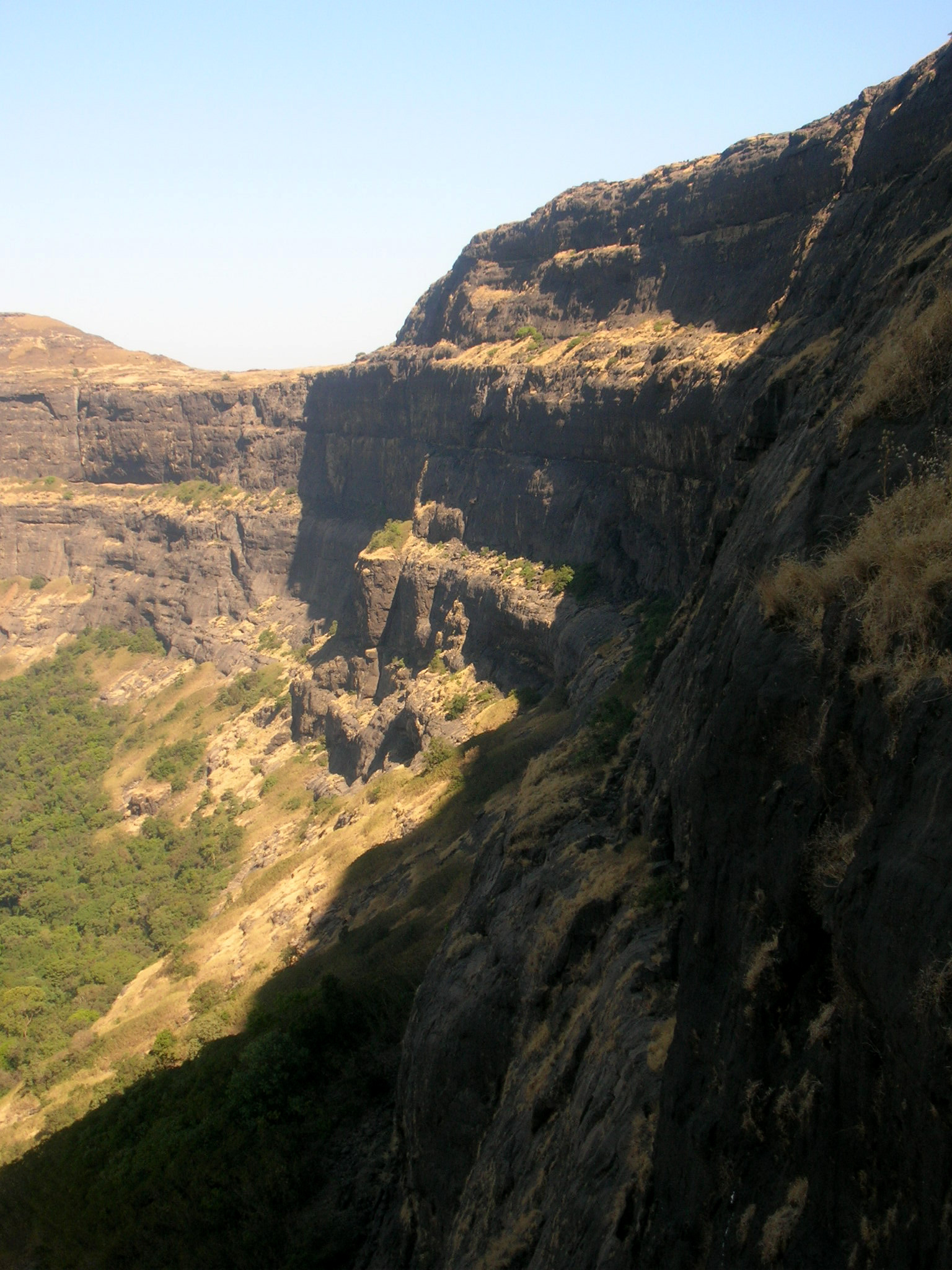

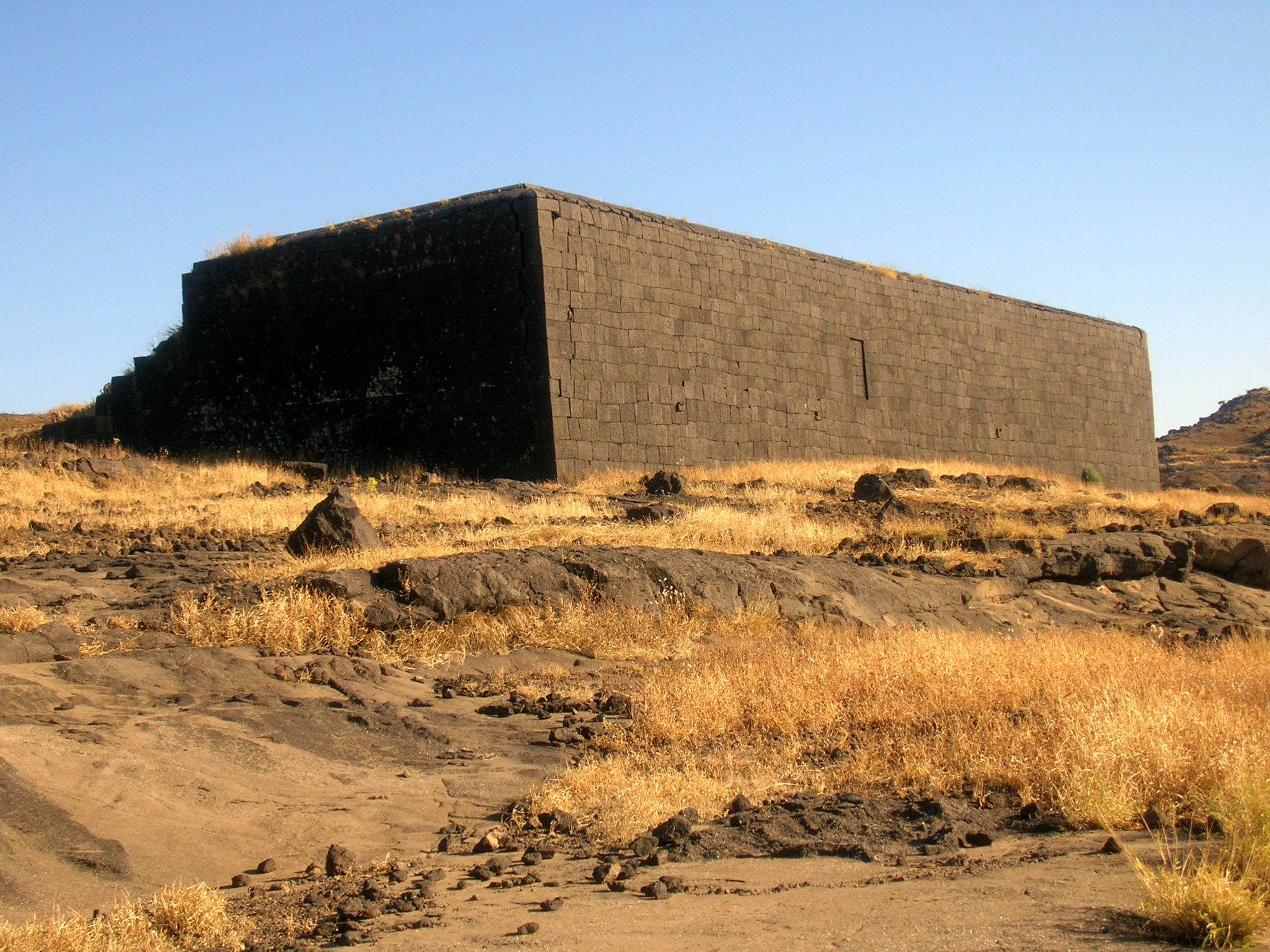

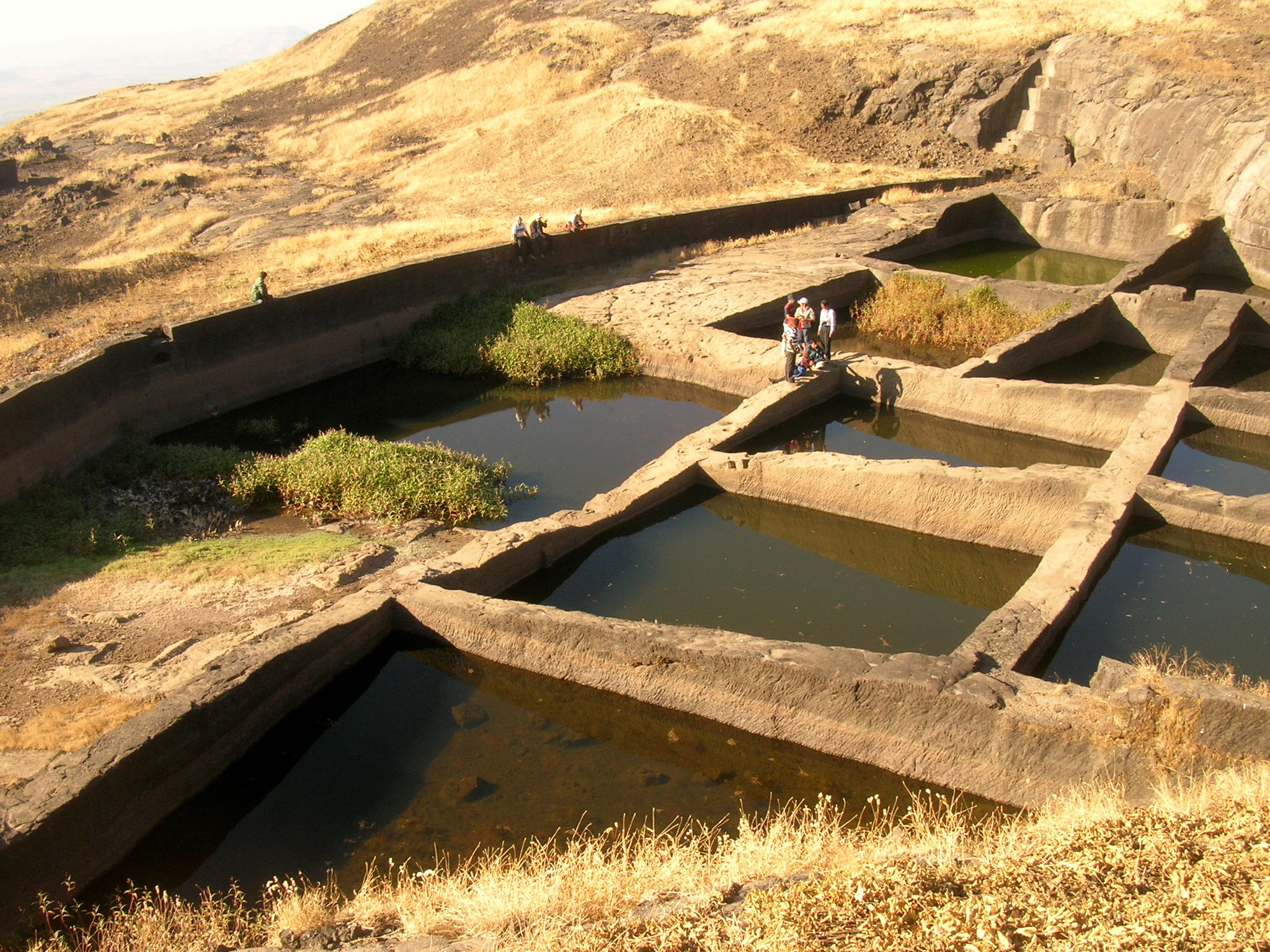

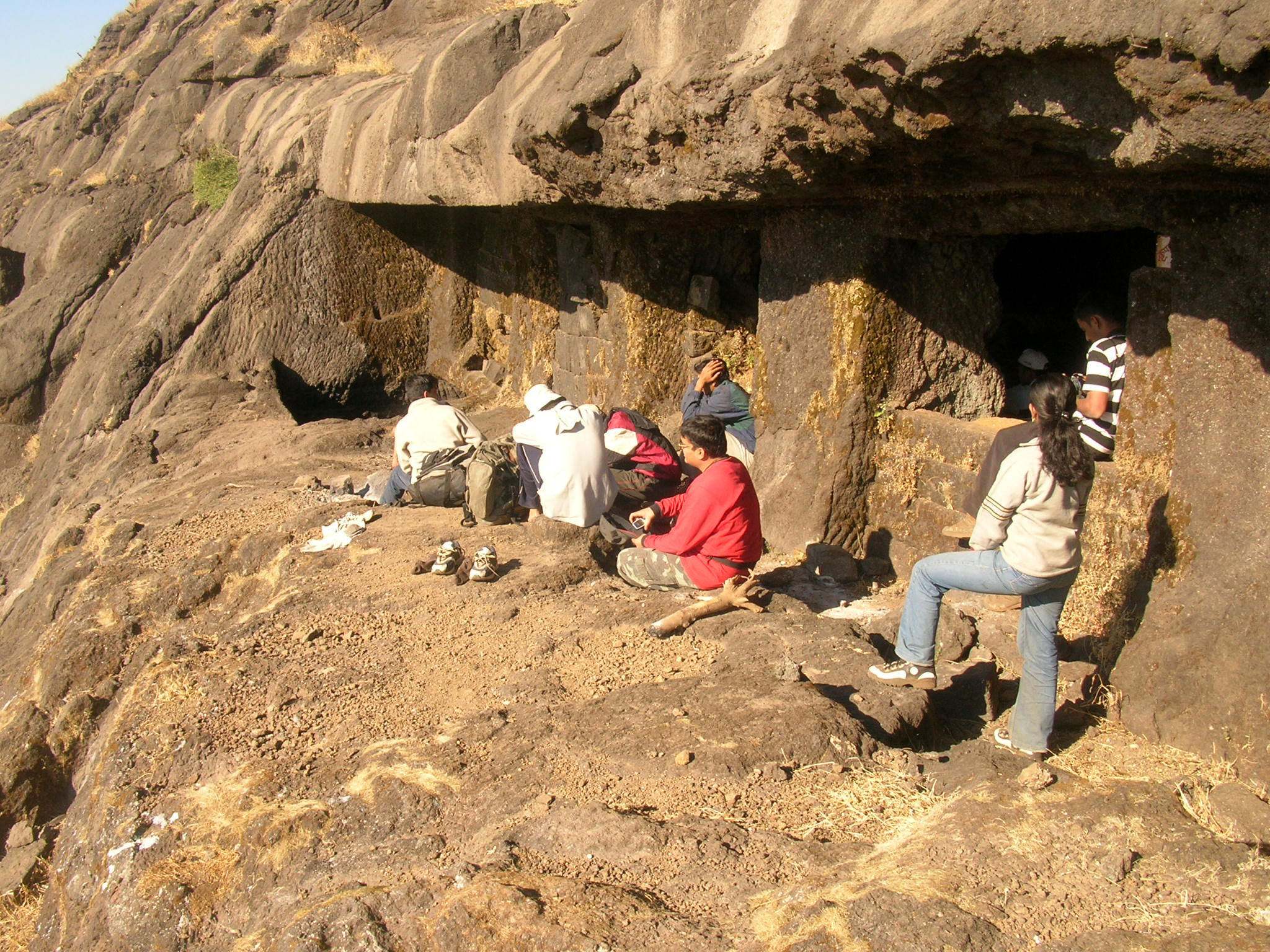

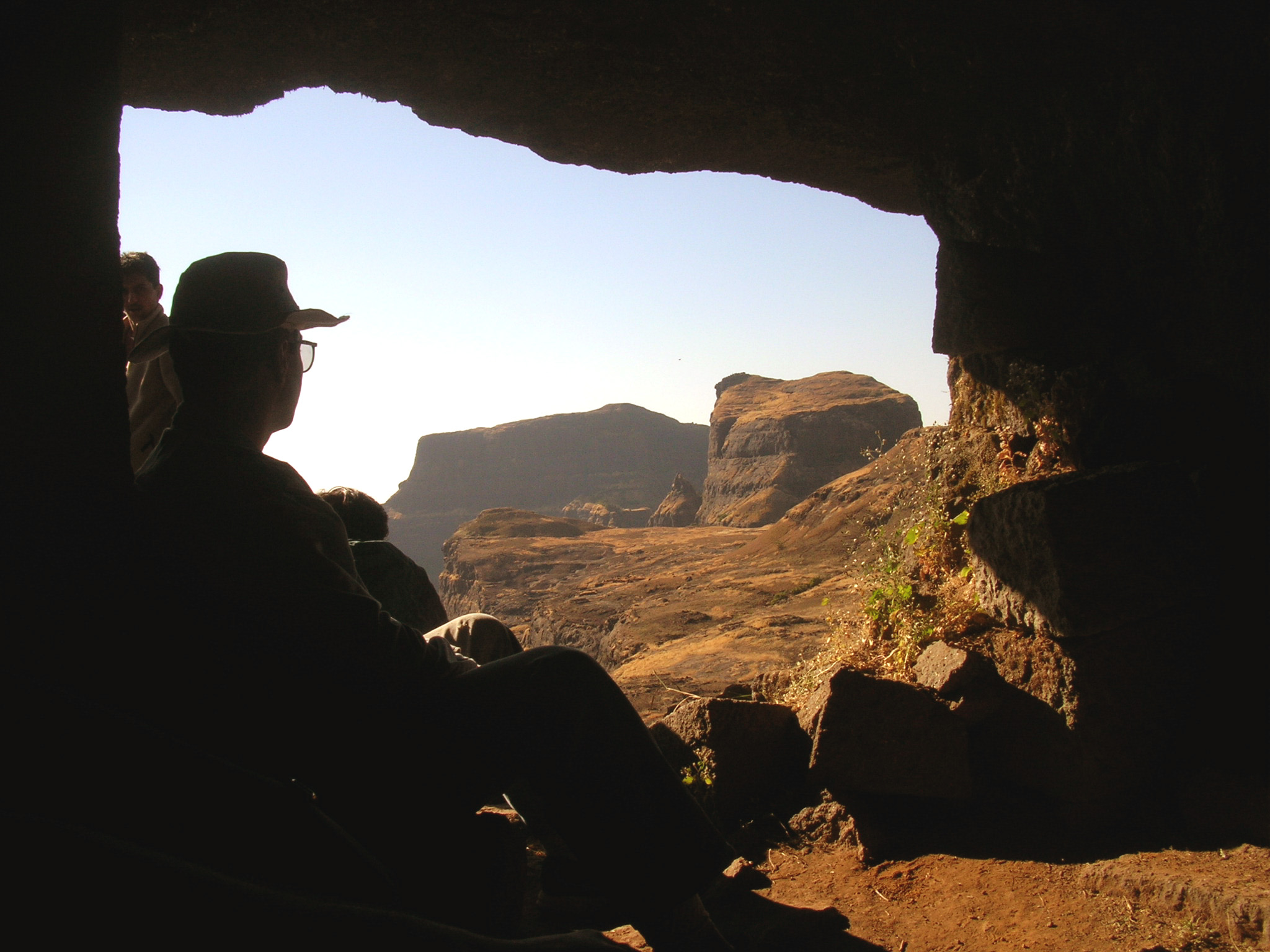

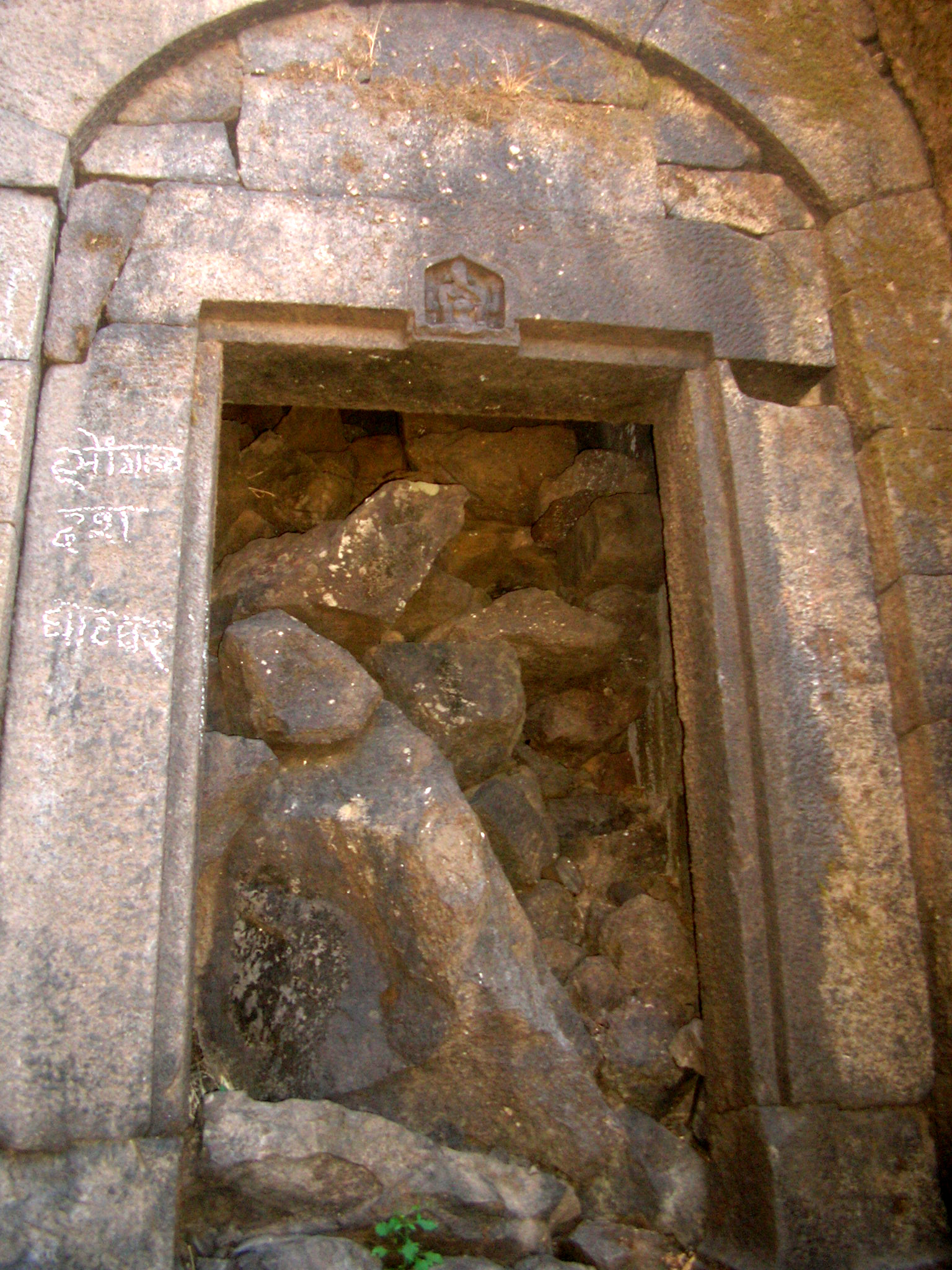

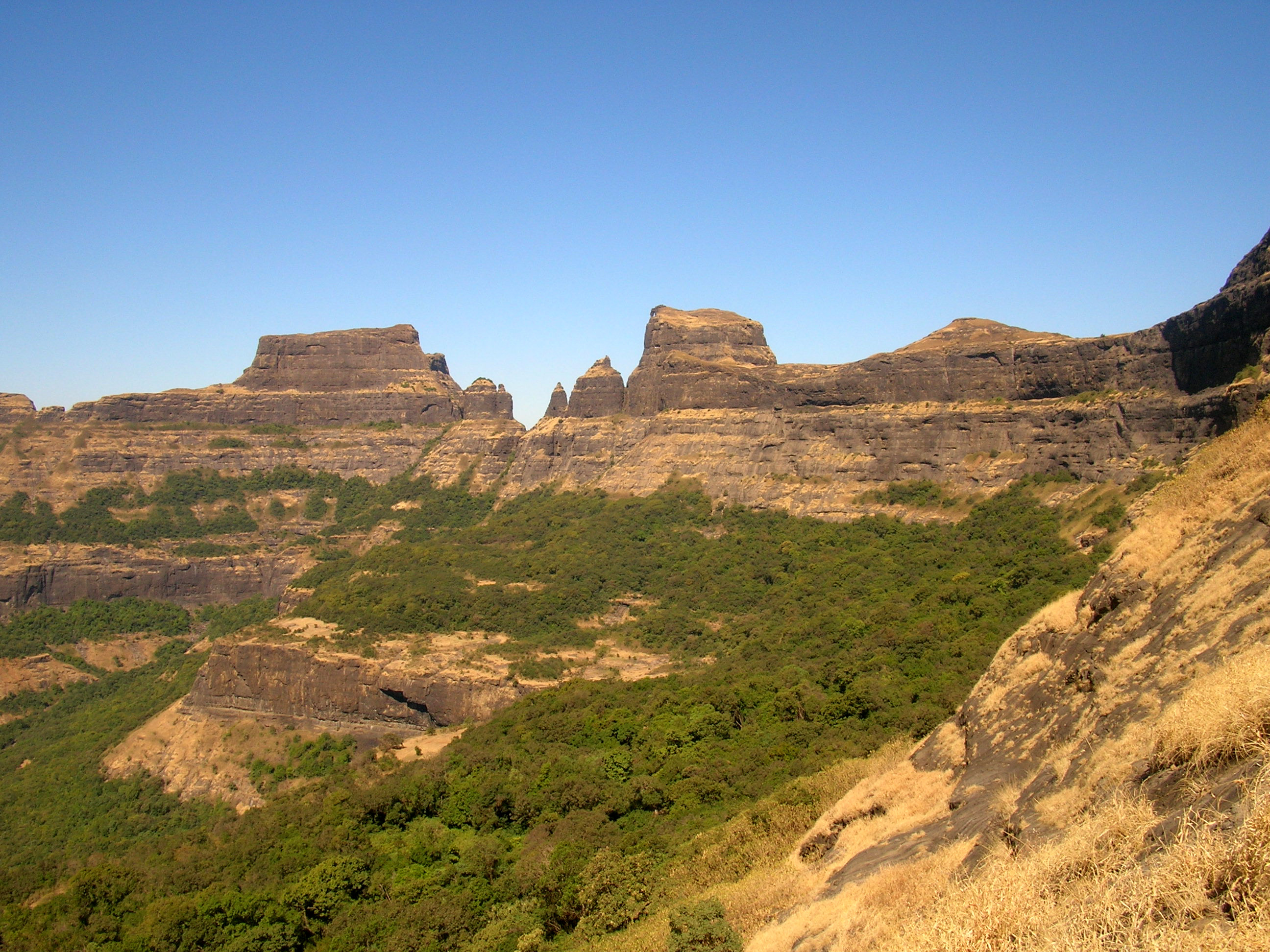

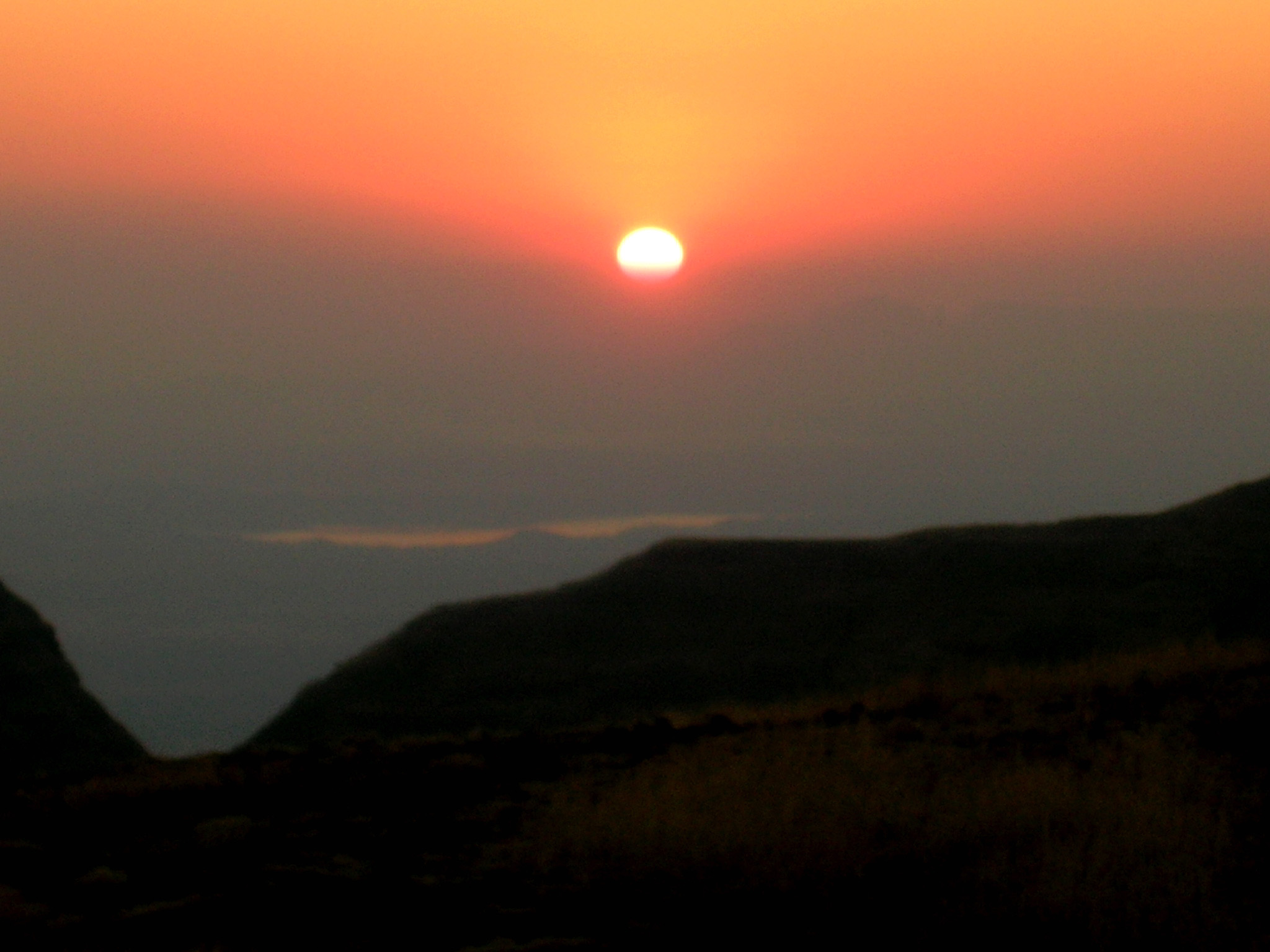

== See also ==
- List of forts in Maharashtra
