= Ambewadi =

Ambewadi may refer to:

- Ambewadi, Dahanu, a village in Maharashtra, India
- Ambewadi, Khanapur, a village in Karnataka, India
