= Jivdhan =

Hill fort in India

Jivdhan Fort
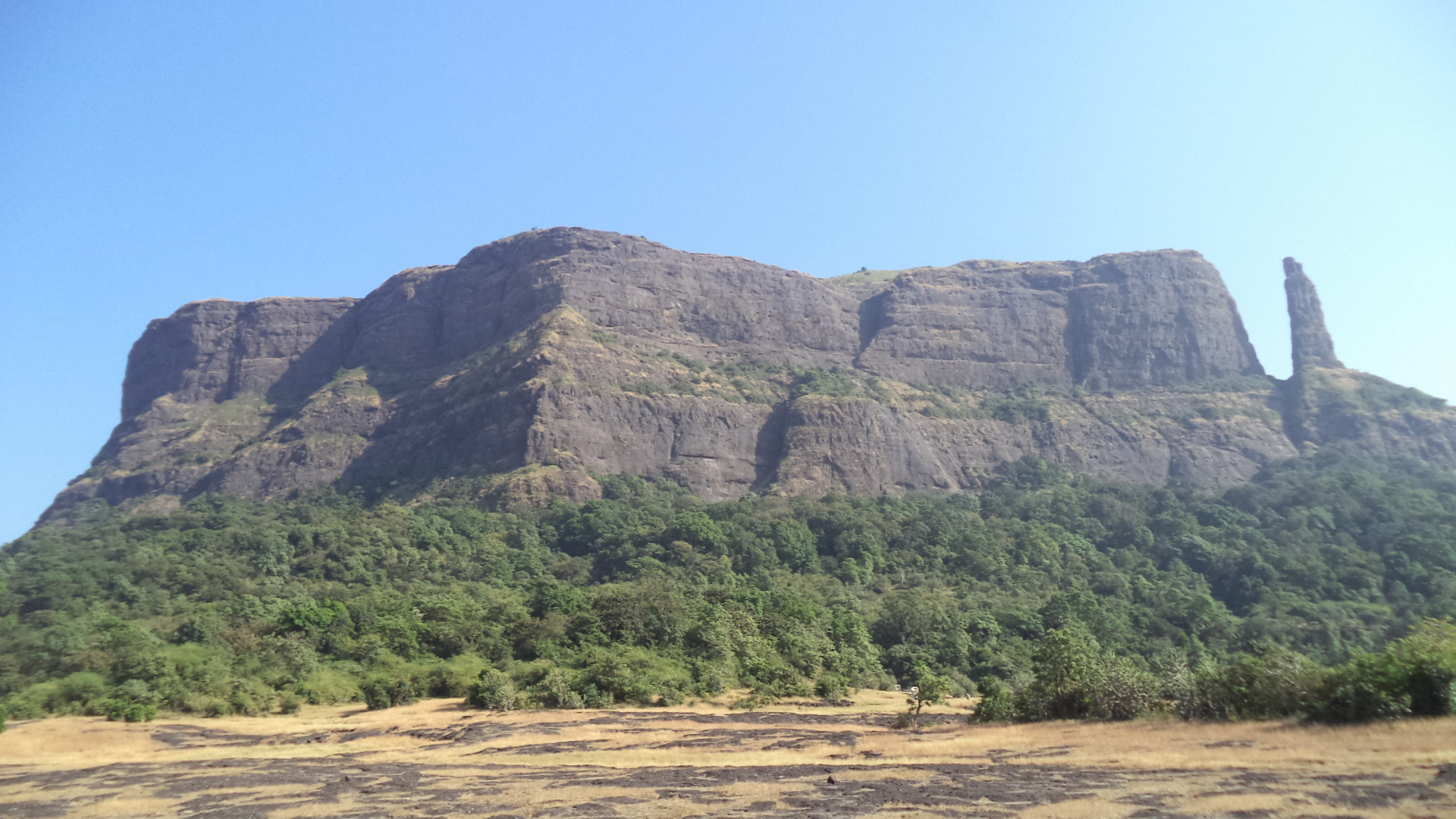
- Jivdhan Fort from Naneghat

Highest point
- Elevation: 3,754 ft (1,144 m)
- Coordinates: 19°16′39″N 73°41′12″E

Naming
- English translation: जीवधन
- Language of name: Marathi

Geography
- Location within Maharashtra
- Location: Nane Ghat, Maharashtra, India
- Parent range: Western Ghats

Geology
- Mountain type: Hill Fort

Jivdhan (or Jeevdhan) is a hill fortress situated 1 km from modern town of Ghatghar in Junnar Taluka of Pune district in Maharashtra, India. The fort, which rises 1,145 meters (3,757 feet) above sea level, is located in the Sahyadri mountain range. The fort was looted and destroyed by the British upon siege between 1815 and 1818.

Jivdhan is a part of the 'Famous 5' trekking destinations among trekking enthusiasts. Chavaand, Hadsar, Shivneri, and Naneghat are the other destinations in the Famous 5 trek. This is a high difficulty grade trek due to the misleading jungle tracks and the necessity and knowledge of using climbing equipment. The rock cut steps are wonderfully carved, which lead to the kalyan gate. There are hooks attached on the walls of the rock cut steps near kalyan gate, which makes it easy for regular climber.

It is said that the boy king Murtaza Nizam Shah III, last nominal ruler of Nizamshahi, was held by Shah Jahan on this fort. Shahaji maharaj rescued the boy king because he had promised that while he was alive, nothing would happen to the boy.

== History ==
The fort originated during the Satavahana era. Every entry point on the forts built by Shivaji Maharaj have a 'Kalas' and Lord Ganesh carved on it. The nearby Naneghat (Toll collection booth) was used for commercial purpose by traders to help in easy movements of goods. As this was an important pass joining the seas to the mainland, it was heavily guarded from enemies. The Jivdhan fort stood as an important guard fort to protect the interests of various kingdoms. The last emperor of Adilshahi of Ahmednagar was little Murtaza. He was kept as a prisoner by the Mughals at Jivdhan fort. In 1635 the father of Shivaji, Shahaji released him from the prison and declared him a King of Ahmednagar. Jivdhan to Naneghat has an open field of 2–3 km, which gives any clear indication of enemy approach.

In 1818 the fort was captured by Col. Prother of the East India Company and later destroyed parts of the fort.

== Major features ==
=== Storehouses ===
There are some unexplored storehouse atop the fort. There is a temple of Goddess at the top. The Main Gate and Kalyan gate are in good condition.

=== Water Tanks ===
There are a few water tanks atop the fort, water from the tanks near the store house is not potable as they are open all the year round. The water from the rock cut cistern near the Kalyan Gate is potable. The entire fort is covered with prickly shrubs of Lepidagathis cuspidata or called as Kate adulsa in Marathi. The Malabar giant squirrel or "Shekhru" is found in the forest at the foothills.

=== Pinnacle near the fort ===
This is about 385 feet high. When you approach the fort it looks smaller in size but as you move closer to the fort you can actually get a feel of how high the pinnacle is. This pinnacle is known as 'Vanarlingi'. This is surmountable with use of proper rock climbing equipment. It may take a day or 2 to climb the pinnacle. One needs to scout the area for beehives in order to climb with complete control.

=== North front ===
At the top of the fort you can view various hilltops and forts nearby. Harishchandragad, Chavaand, Ratangad, Naneghat, Hadsar fort, Nimgiri fort, Manikdoh Dam and the entire Junnar plateau are visible from the top.

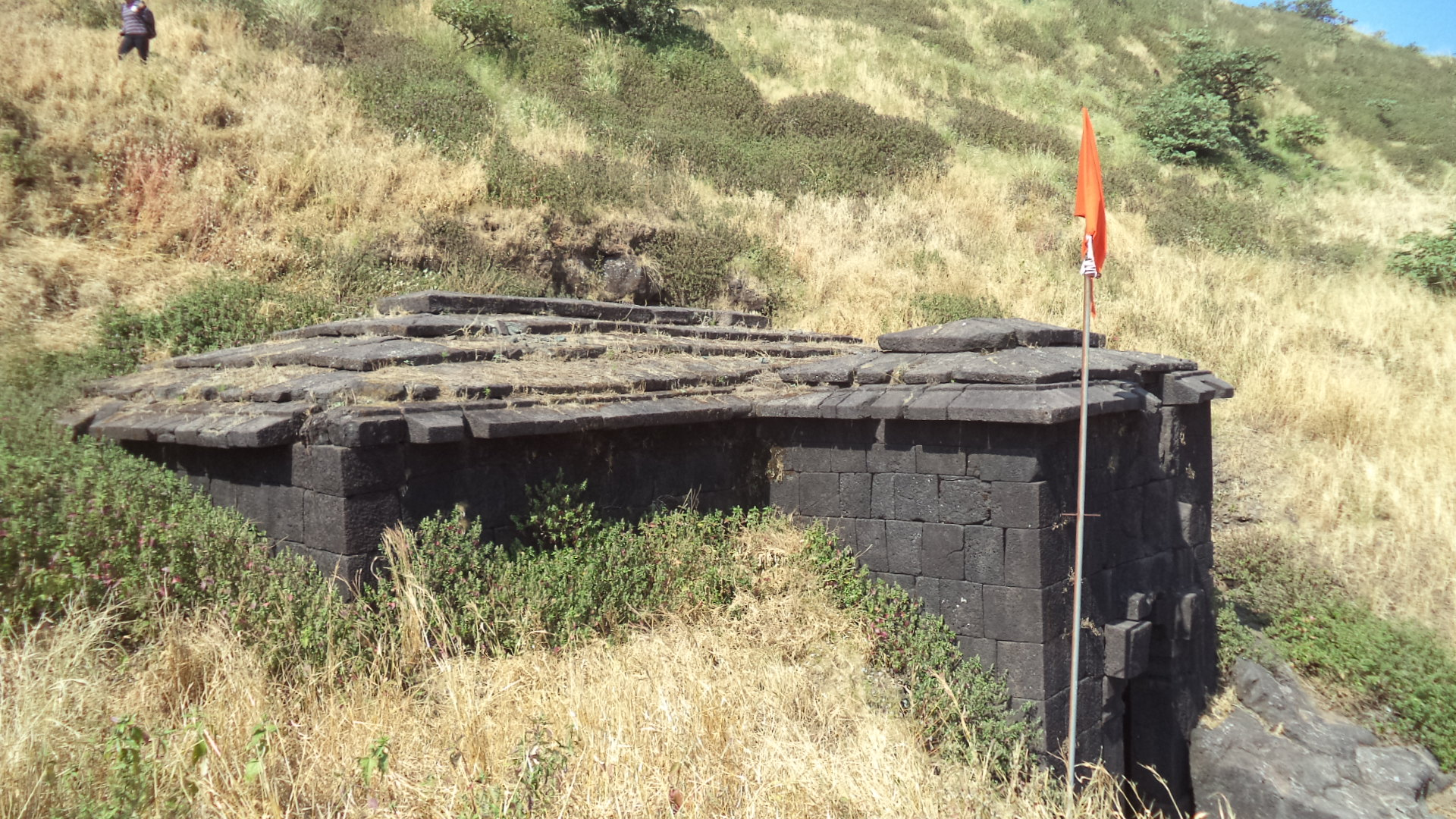
Temple

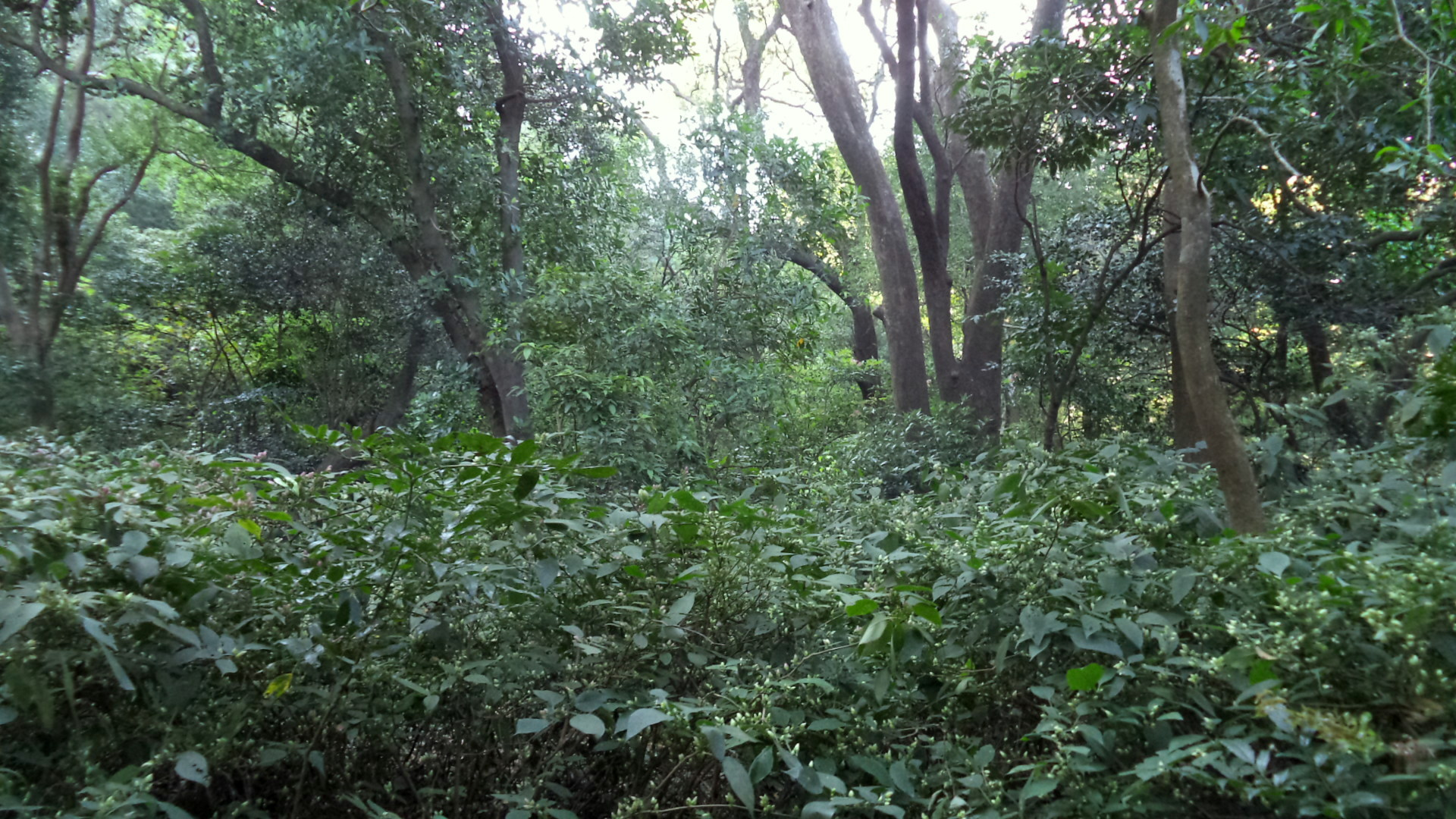
Forest at the foothills of the fort

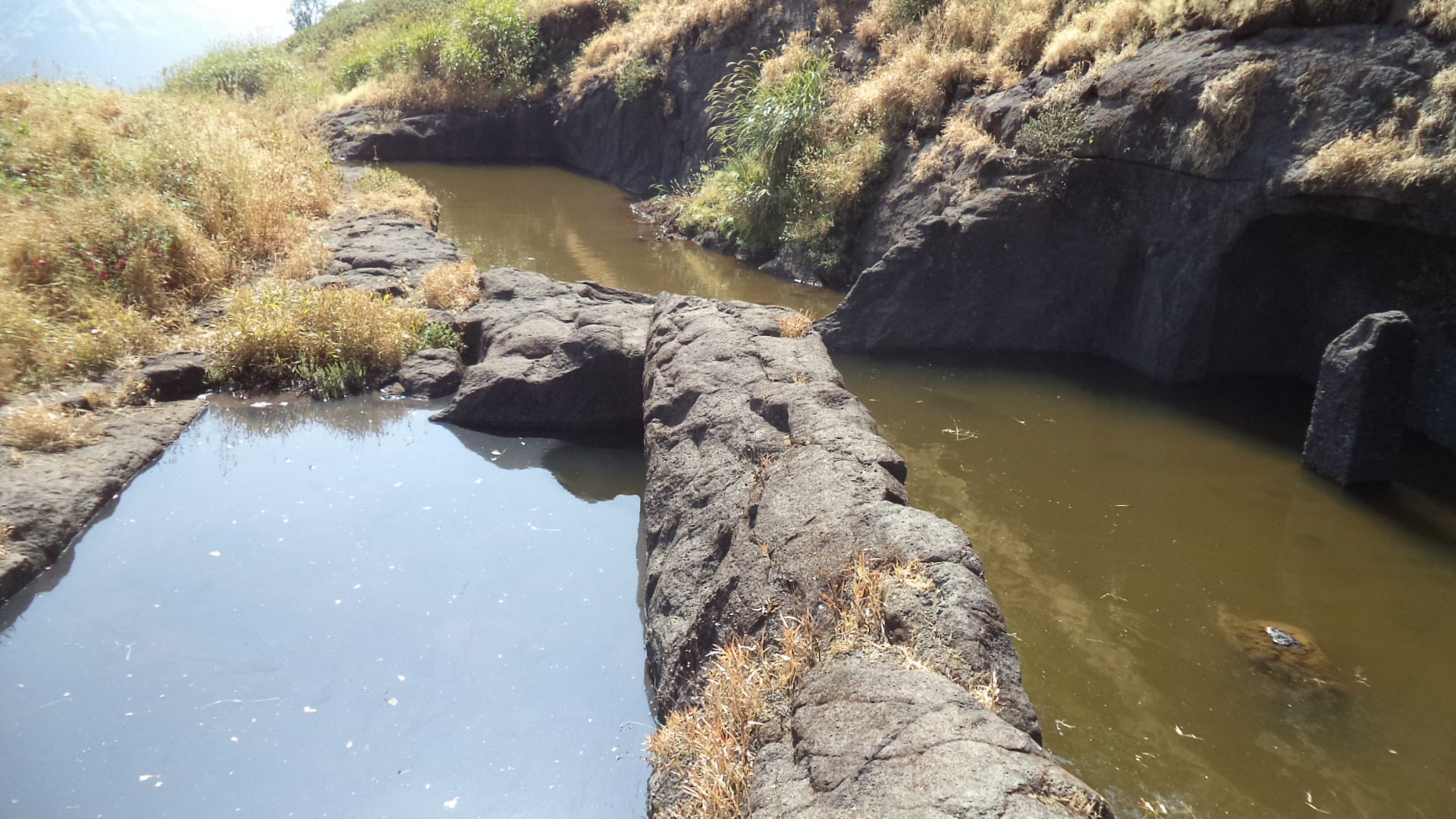
Rock cut cisterns on the fort
