= Kulang Fort =

Fort in Kalsubai range, India

- Part of Kalsubai Range
- Nashik district, Maharashtra
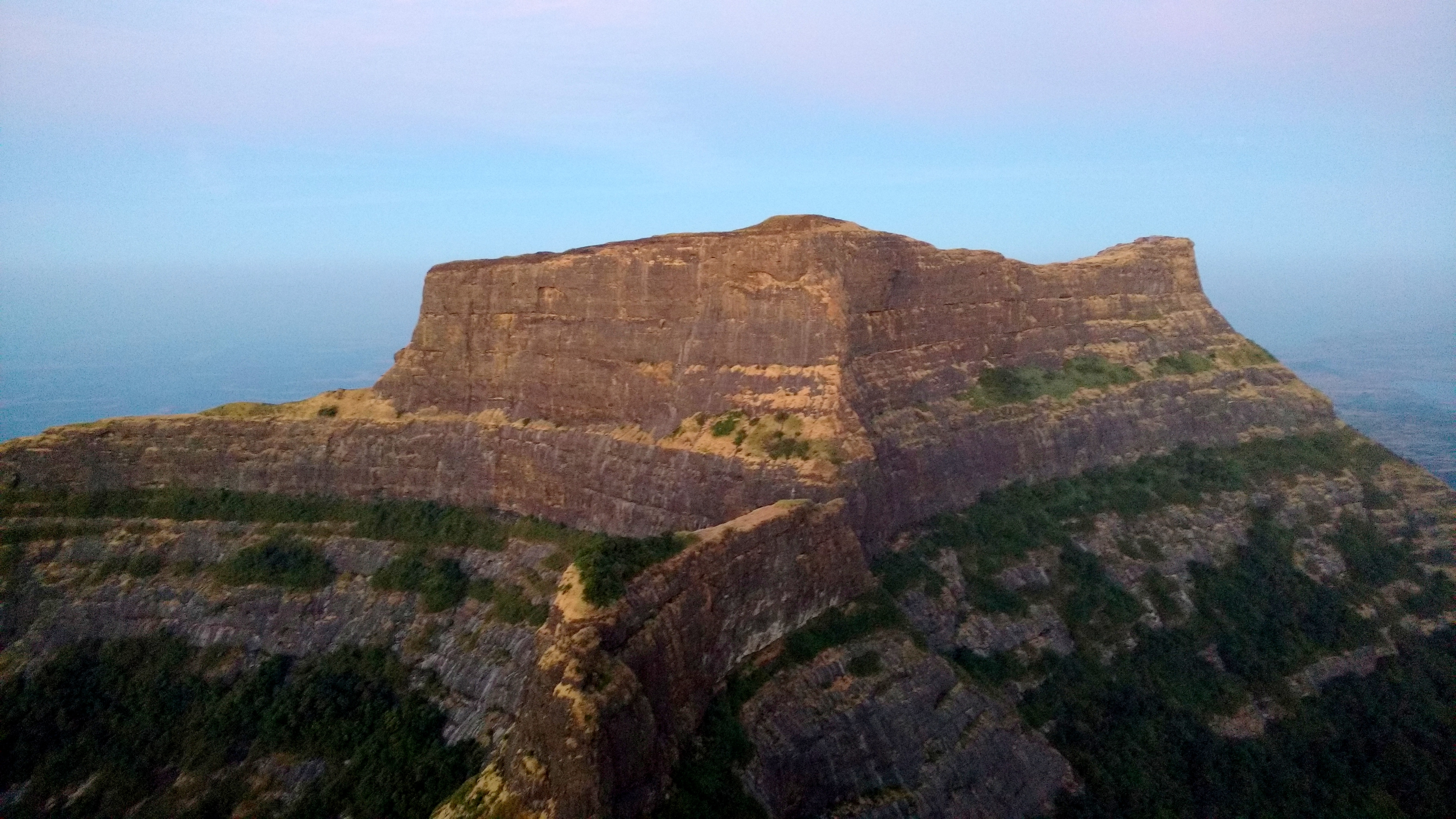
- Kulang fort from Madangad Fort

Site information
- Type: Hill fort
- Owner: Government of India
- Open to the public: Yes
- Condition: Ruins

Location
- Shown within Maharashtra
- Coordinates: 19°35′30.1″N 73°38′21.4″E
- Height: 4825 feet

Site history
- Built: Satvahan Era
- Materials: Stone
- Grade: Tough

Kulang fort is located in the Igatpuri area of Nashik district, on the western side of the Kalsubai hill range. This fort is adjacent to the Madangad and Alang forts, all of which were constructed to protect the Nashik-Kalyan ancient commercial road.

== History ==
In 1760 the fort were probably ceded by the Moghuls to the Peshwa along with many other forts in the Nashik region. In 1818 Kulang along with the other nearby forts were captured by the British forces. The British, however did not destroy the steps of this fort

== Places to see ==
There are few rock cut cisterns and a cave on the fort. There is no significant construction on the fort, except for a Wada made from stone masonry and the ruined main gate. The pathway to the fort is made of rock cut steps. From the top of this fort Kalsubai peak, Patta, Aundha, Madangad Fort, Alang Fort and Ratangad forts are easily visible.

== How to reach ==
There is a base village Ambevadi or Kurangwadi, from which it takes about two to three hours to reach the fort. The path passes through a dense forest area, the Kalsubai-Harishchandragad Wildlife Sanctuary. There is potable water on the way and plenty of clean water on the fort. There are spacious caves on the fort which could accommodate up to 100 persons. There is no fuel wood on the fort, so it is preferable to carry fuel wood or a gas-stove from the base village.

== Gallery ==
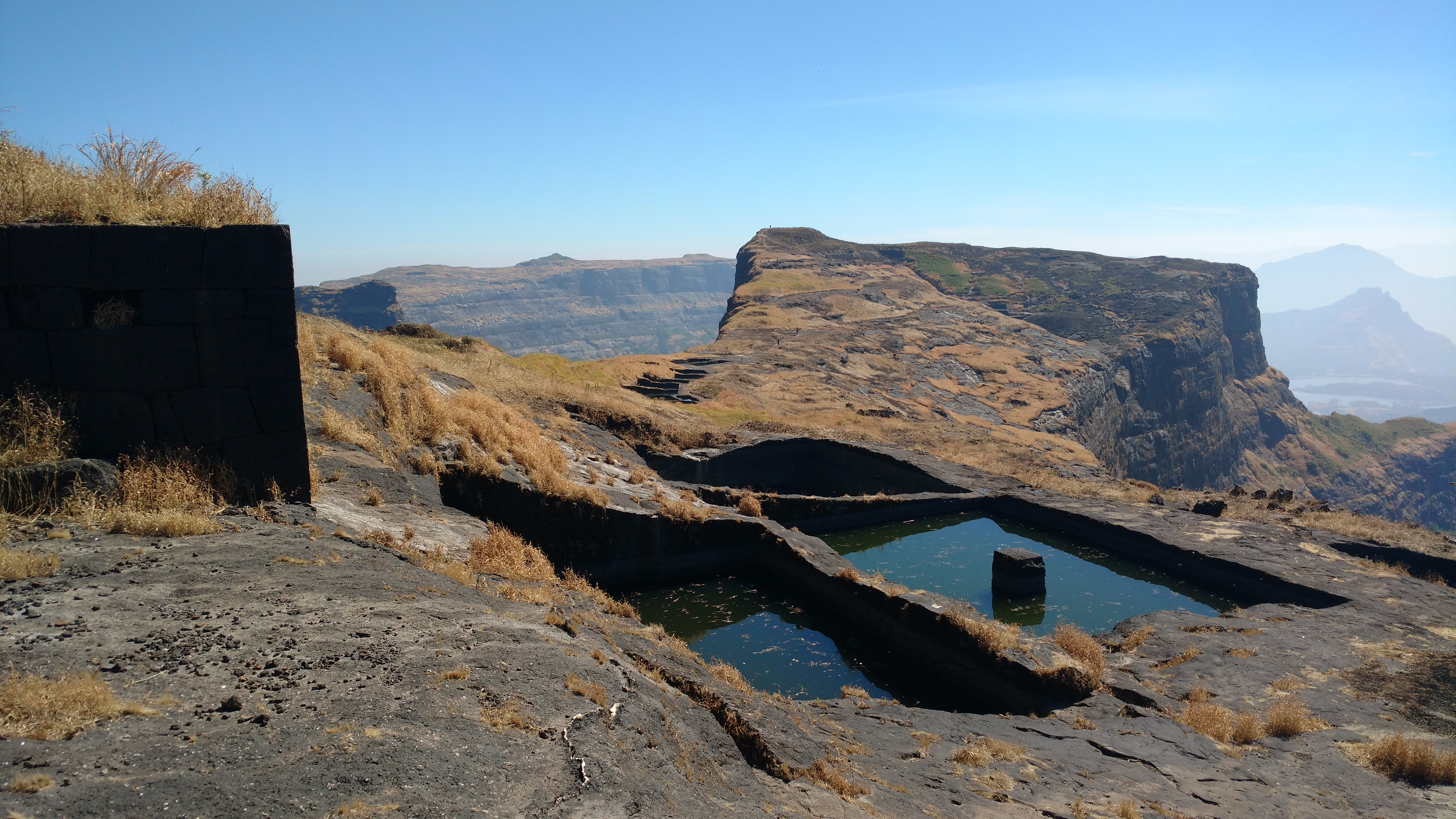
Water cisterns

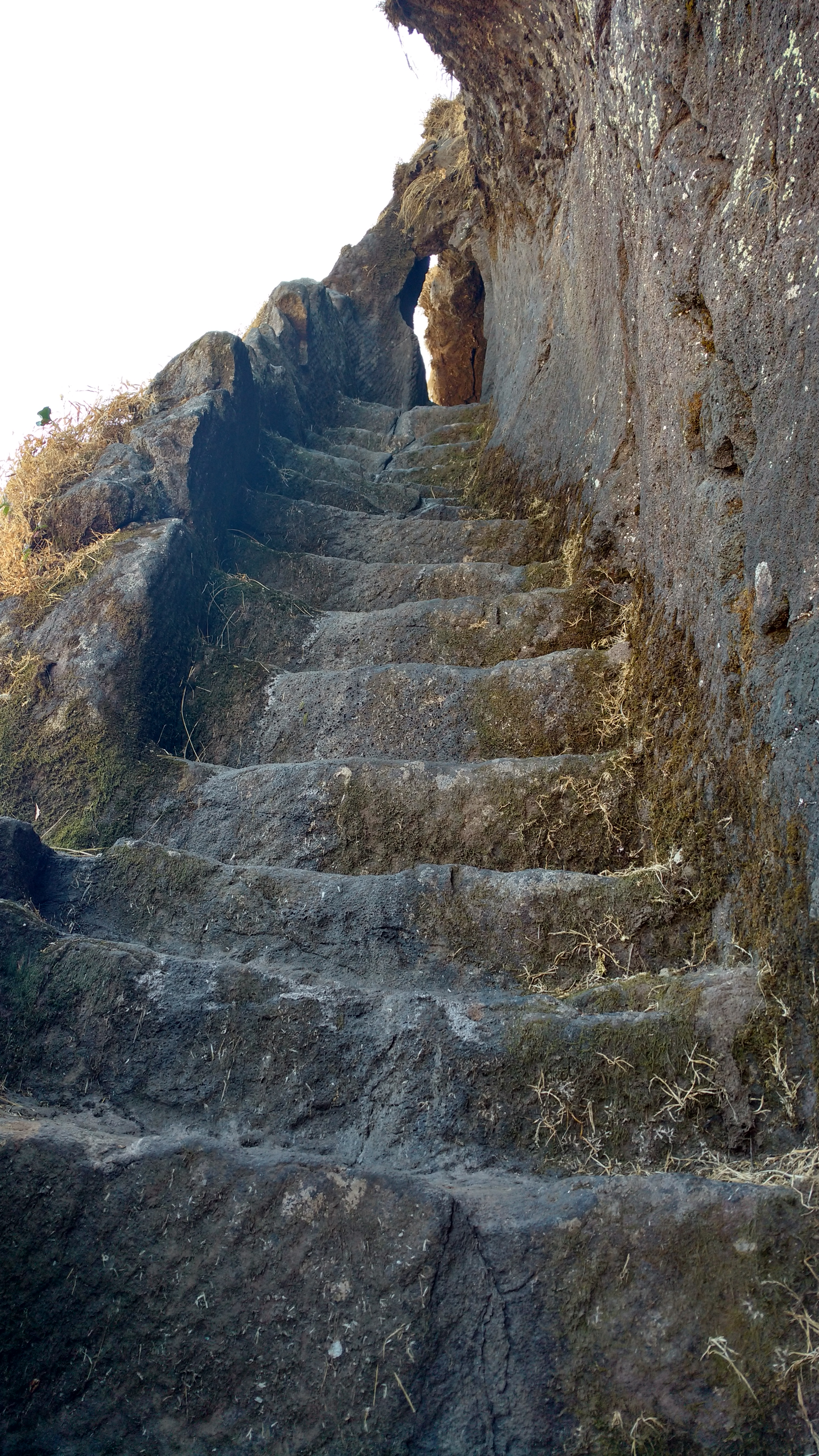
Rock cut steps
