= Chavand, Maharashtra =

Fortress in India

Prasannagad
- Part of Sahyadri Hill Range
- Pune district, Maharashtra

Site information
- Type: Hill fort
- Owner: Government of India
- Controlled by: Ahilyanagar (1521-1594) Maratha Empire (1739-1818); United Kingdom: East India Company (1818-1857); British Raj (1857-1947); India (1947-)
- Open to the public: Yes
- Condition: Ruins

Location
- Shown within Maharashtra
- Coordinates: 19°14′12.7″N 73°44′53.6″E
- Height: 3400 Ft.

Site history
- In use: Guarding the trade route
- Materials: Stone

Chavand is a hill fortress situated 30 km from the modern-day town of Naryangoan in Junnar Taluka of Pune district in Maharashtra, India. The fort, which rises 1,036 meters (3,399 feet) above sea level, is located in the Sahyadri mountain range. The fort was looted and destroyed by the British upon siege. This is one of the forts known as the 'Famous 5'. Chavaand, Hadsar, Shivneri, Jivdhan and Naneghat form the Famous 5 trek. The fort has remnants of construction that are more than 800 years old. Village of Chavand lies at the base of the fort. Under the rule of Shivaji I, this was known as Prasannagad.

== History ==
Founder of Ahilyanagar , Ahmad Nizam Shah, was the first Nizamshah who acquired the fort of Chavand after the dissolution of the Bahmani Kingdom. The seventh Nizamshah was Burhanshah II. Bahadurshah's grandson was imprisoned 1594 and was taken away to this fort. Bahadurshah is the nephew of Chand Bibi. In 1636, the Mughals got the fort of Chavand by signing a treaty with the Nizams. On 1 May 1818, the British forces captured the fort.

== Geography ==
Chavand fort is approximately 20 km away from the city of Junnar in Pune district, and is a popular destination for trekkers and adventure enthusiasts as well. There is a varied flora and fauna around the foothills of the Chavand fort trek. There are 12 various species of birds to observe. The base village of the Chavand Fort is Chavandwadi village.

There is a huge stone door called the Mahadarwaja which is still structurally intact. There is a Chamunda Devi Mandir on the fort along with a few remnants of a cannon as well. There are seven water tanks carved out of a single stone. The top of the fort offers splendid views of the neighbouring regions along with views of forts like Shivneri, Jivdhan and Hadsar. One can also see the seven tanks, the Kukadi river and the Manikdoh dam.
