= Bitangad =

Ancient Indian fort

Bitangad Fort, Bitka
- Nashik district, Maharashtra

Site information
- Type: Hill fort
- Owner: Government of India
- Open to the public: Yes
- Condition: Ruins

Location
- Shown within Maharashtra Bitangad Fort, Bitka (India)
- Coordinates: 19°39′13.79″N 73°47′10.11″E
- Height: 4000 fts above msl

Site history
- Materials: Stone

Bitangad Fort is a fort in Nashik district in the Igatpuri taluka in Maharashtra state of India.

== Location ==
The fort is located about 130 km from Mumbai. The nearest town is Ghoti. The fort lies about 22 km east of the Ghoti town on Kalsubai hill range. The fort is situated near the village Taked. A short walk from the Hanuman temple at Taked leads to the base village Bitanwadi.

== Places to see ==
This fort can be reached after an easy walk of 30mins followed by a steep rock technical climb of another half an hour from the base village Bitangad. There are no proper fortifications or bastions left on the fort except for a few rock cut caves and water cisterns.

== History ==
Very little history of this fort is known. It was used as a watch tower.
