= Ambewadi, Khanapur =

Ambewadi
- Village
- Location in Karnataka, India Ambewadi (India)
- Coordinates: 15.525134°N 74.4554936°E
- Country: India
- State: Karnataka
- District: Belgaum
- Talukas: Khanapur
- Elevation: 724 m (2,375 ft)

Languages
  - Official: Kannada
- Time zone: UTC+5:30 (IST)

Ambewadi is a village in Belgaum district in the southern state of Karnataka, India.

It is located 31 km south of the Belgaum district headquarters, and 517 km from the state capital of Bangalore.

Ambewadi's pin code is 591302, and its postal head office is in Khanapur.

The village is bordered by Belgaum Taluk in the north, Bylahongal Taluk in the east, and Supa Taluk and Haliyal Taluk towards the South.
