= Kasara, Dahanu =

Village in Maharashtra

Kasara
- village
- Location in Maharashtra, India Kasara (India)
- Coordinates: 20.0153961°N 72.7557095°E
- Country: India
- State: Maharashtra
- District: Palghar
- Taluka: Dahanu
- Elevation: 28 m (92 ft)

Population (2011)
  - Total: 1,954
- Time zone: UTC+5:30 (IST)
- 2011 census code: 551598

Kasara is a village in the Palghar district of Maharashtra, India. It is located in the Dahanu taluka.

== Demographics ==
According to the 2011 census of India, Kasara has 425 households. The effective literacy rate (i.e. the literacy rate of population excluding children aged 6 and below) is 55.81%.

Demographics (2011 Census)
	Total	Male	Female
Population	1954	1017	937
Children aged below 6 years	302	162	140
Scheduled caste	4	2	2
Scheduled tribe	1752	907	845
Literates	922	559	363
Workers (all)	927	546	381
Main workers (total)	640	386	254
Main workers: Cultivators	23	17	6
Main workers: Agricultural labourers	205	115	90
Main workers: Household industry workers	14	9	5
Main workers: Other	398	245	153
Marginal workers (total)	287	160	127
Marginal workers: Cultivators	9	5	4
Marginal workers: Agricultural labourers	205	115	90
Marginal workers: Household industry workers	11	1	10
Marginal workers: Others	62	39	23
Non-workers	1027	471	556
