= Trymbakgad =

Fort in Maharashtra, India

Trymbakgad Fort
- त्र्यंबकगड
- Part of Trymbak Hill Range
- Nashik district, Maharashtra

Site information
- Type: Hill fort
- Owner: Government of India
- Controlled by: Nizamashahi dynasty (1521–1629); Moghul Empire(1636–1670); Maratha Empire (1670–1689); Moghul Empire(1689–1730); Maratha Empire (1730–1818) United Kingdom (1818–1947): East India Company (1818–1857); British Raj (1857–1947); India (1947-)
- Open to the public: Yes
- Condition: Ruins

Location
- Shown within Maharashtra
- Location within Maharashtra Location within India
- Coordinates: 19°55′10.9″N 73°31′08.3″E
- Height: 4200 Ft.

Site history
- Materials: Stone

Trymbakgad Fort/Brahmagiri Fort (Marathi: त्र्यंबकगड किल्ला) is a fort located 30 km from Nashik, in Nashik district, of Maharashtra, India. This is an important fort in Nashik district. It is located on a hill adjoining the famous Trimbakeshwar temple.

== History ==
This fort was built during the period of Yadavas of Devgiri. It was under the control of brother of Ramchandra of Devgiri from 1271 to 1308. This fort was then under the control of Bahamani rulers followed by Nijamshah of Ahmednagar. Shahaji Bhosale rebelled against the Moghuls and captured many forts from Trymbak to Junnar in 1629. Shahaji was defeated and surrendered to Khanjamam at Mahuli fort in 1636 and this fort was surrendered to the Moghuls. In 1670 Peshwa Moropant Trimbak Pingle a chieftain of Maratha King Shivaji raje captured this fort. Moghul army tried to capture this fort after a long siege from 1682 to 1684. Finally, the fort was surrendered to Moghul. This fort was captured by Shahu Maharaj in 1691 and was under the control of Maratha empire till 1818 after which it was captured by the British army.

== How to reach ==
The base village of the fort is Trymbakeshwar. There are good hotels in this town. The trekking path starts from the hillock south of the Trymbakehwar. The route is very safe and wide. It takes about an hour to reach the entrance gate of the fort. The night stay on the fort can be made in the temple on the fort.

== Tourist spots ==
The Siddha cave and the place of origin of Godavari River are to be visited on the fort. This fort is joined to the Bhandardurg fort by a narrow natural bridge.

== See also ==
- List of forts in Maharashtra
- List of forts in India
- Trimbakeshwar Shiva Temple
- Marathi People
- List of Maratha dynasties and states
- Maratha War of Independence
- Battles involving the Maratha Empire
- Maratha Army
- Maratha titles
- Military history of India
