= Madangad Fort =

Fort in Maharashtra, India

Madangad
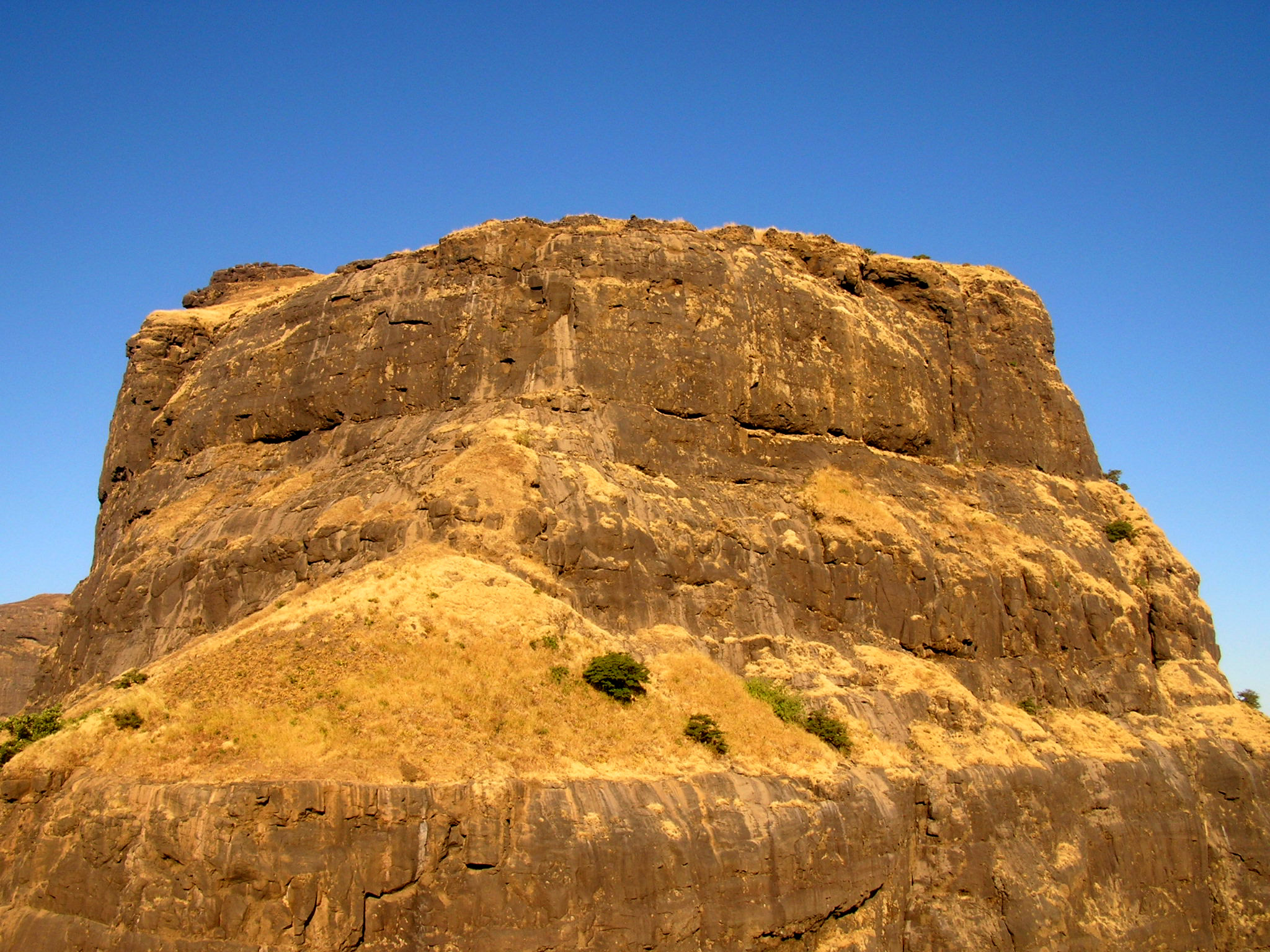
- Madan gad from Alang gad

Highest point
- Elevation: 4,900 ft (1,500 m)
- Coordinates: 19°35′23″N 73°38′57″E

Naming
- English translation: मदनगड
- Language of name: Marathi

Geography
- Location within Maharashtra
- Location: Ambewadi, Maharashtra, India
- Parent range: Western Ghats

Geology
- Mountain type: Hill Fort

Madangad is a fort in the Nashik region of Maharashtra, India in the Kalsubai range.

== Fascinating Spots ==
Unlike Alang Fort, the top of the fort is a relatively small and tilted plateau. On the fort, there are a cave and 2 water cisterns. There are no man-made structures, building remnants over the fort. Alang, Kalasubai, Aundha Fort, Patta and Bitangad are to the east of the fort; Harihar, Trymbakgad and Anjaneri to its north; Harishchandragad, Aajobagad, Khutta (pinnacle), Ratangad and Katrabai to its south; and Kulang to the west.

== Ways To Reach ==
Igatpuri/Kasara-Ghoti-Pimpalnermor-Ambevadi route. First reach Kasara station which is on Nashik-Kalyan route. Take a cab for Rs. 1200/- which will drop you at Ambewadi or Samrad. From Samrad hire a local guide for Rs.1500/ per 10 persons. The guide will manage 2 breakfast, 3 meals and all necessary equipment( ropes, carabiners, harness etc.) for ascending and descending.

Alang, Madan and Kulang are situated in same region and are beside each other in the same range of mountains. To reach Alang or Madan, go to Kasara or Igatpuri and then Ambevadi by the Igatpuri/Kasara-Ghoti-Pimpalnermor route. There is a bus service from Ghoti to Ambevadi. Ambevadi is 32 km away from Ghoti. A bus is available at 6 a.m. from Ghoti to Ambevadi. We can easily see Alang, Madan and Kulang from there. From Ambevadi, a way goes to the ridge between Alang and Madan, which may take up to 3 hours. From the ridge, the fort visible on the left is Alang, while the one on the right is Madan. It takes 2 to 3 hours to reach at the top of Madan from the col. There are three parts of climbing the Madan.

=== Walk from ridge to steep rock patch ===
The trail features narrow walking steps exposed to the valley, making the trek distinctive. At Madan, some steps are small, with the valley exposed on one side. Bulky equipment, such as a large rucksack and sleeping mat, may obstruct movement on the narrow steps, as contact with the rock wall can displace the trekker towards the valley. The next steep rock section is reached in approximately 30 to 45 minutes.

=== Rock patch of around 40 ft ===
You have to climb the rock path of around 40 ft with the help of ropes, harnesses, carabiners, etc. It might take 30 minutes to 1 hour to set up the ropes and get the whole group up. This is a challenging part of the trek. Since Madan has only one route to climb and descend, the same path must be used for the descent

=== Steps to reach top after rock patch ===
After the rock patch is climbed the path takes a western detour through a very narrow ridge. These are the most dreaded and continuous small steps engraved into the forts top part. Top part of fort looks like a single giant rock in the aerial view. These steps are not even and quite small which makes difficult to climb and very difficult to descend. This part takes around 30 to 45 minutes. Again it makes difficult to walk with lot of volume in this part of climb.

=== Ghatghar via Ghoti-Bhandardara ===
Another way towards fort is from Ghatghar. Go via Ghoti-Bhandardara. From there, in 2½ hours, one can come to the third cavern. Via Bhandardara from Udadvade. Another way towards the fort is via Bhandardara from Udadvade gaon. From here you reach till a plateau and then there are two routes to go to Madan. On first and mostly taken route, climb the Alang fort on the left and descend down via rappelling 80 ft rock patch on the other side of fort to reach common ridge point. Though this is difficult route, it is preferred to visit the Alang on day one, stay there at night and to do Madan trek on the second day by descending. Second route is reach directly to the common ridge point for Madan and Alang, keeping Alang fort wall on the left.

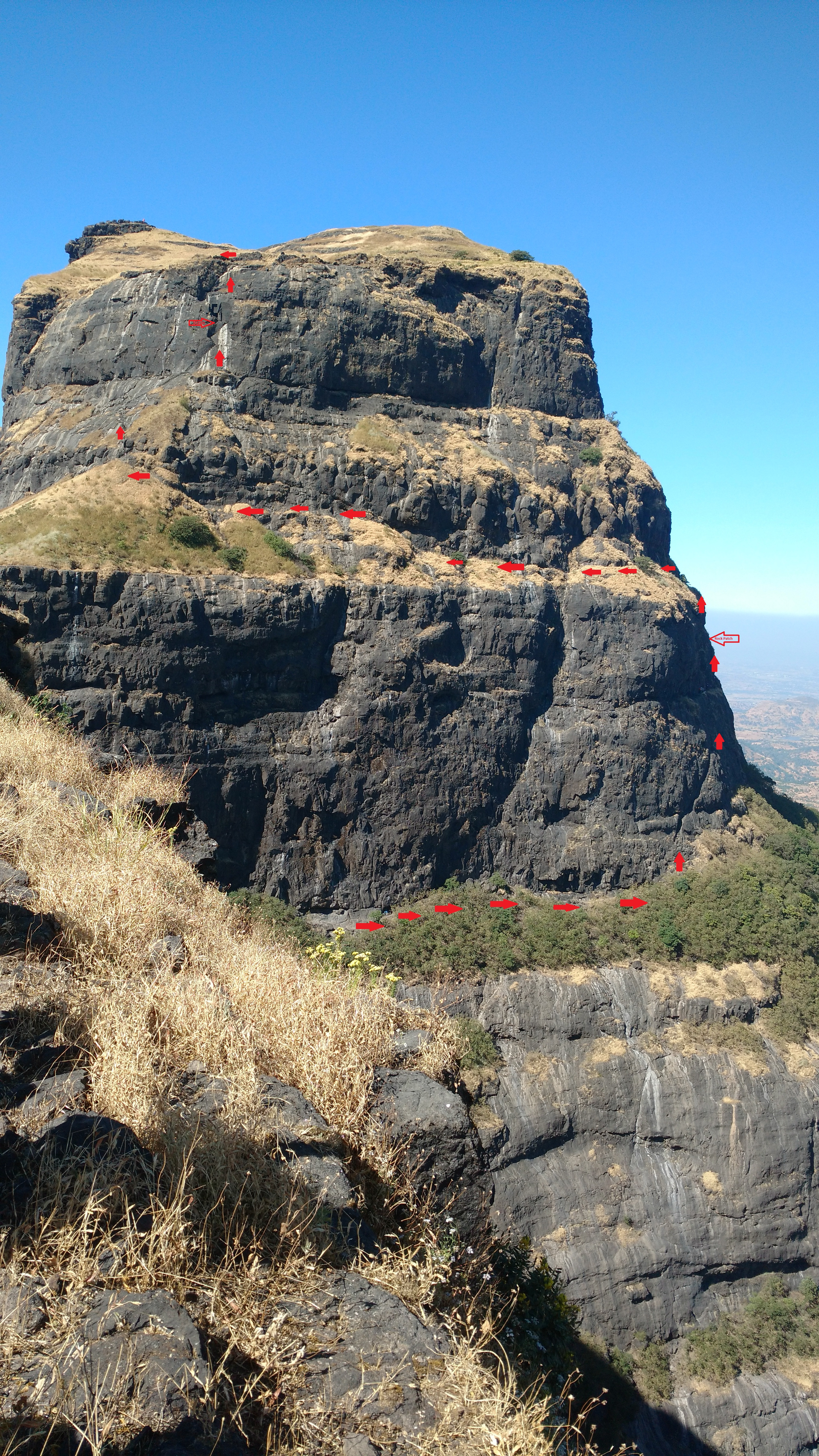
Trek route on Madangad fort

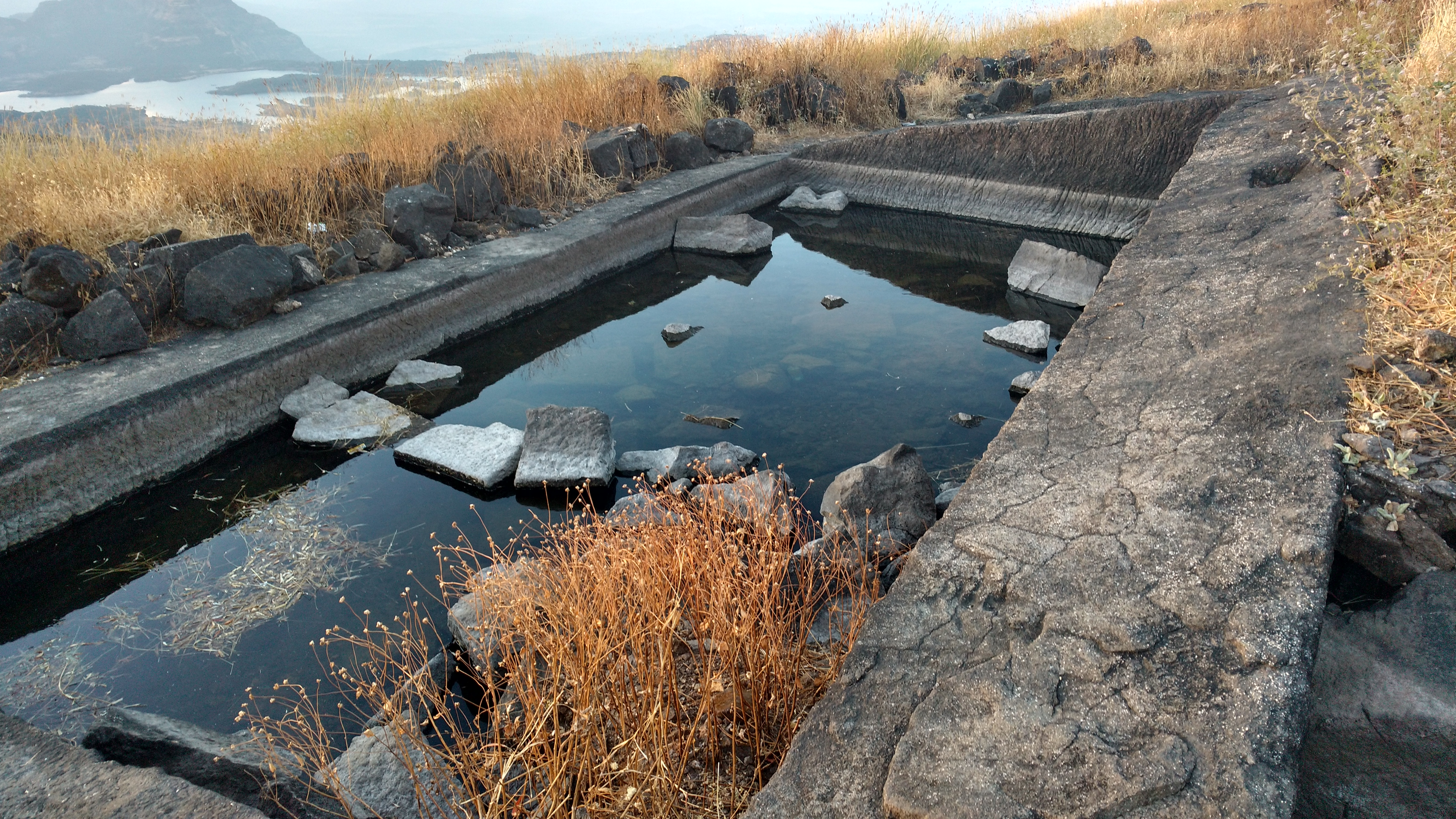
Water cistern

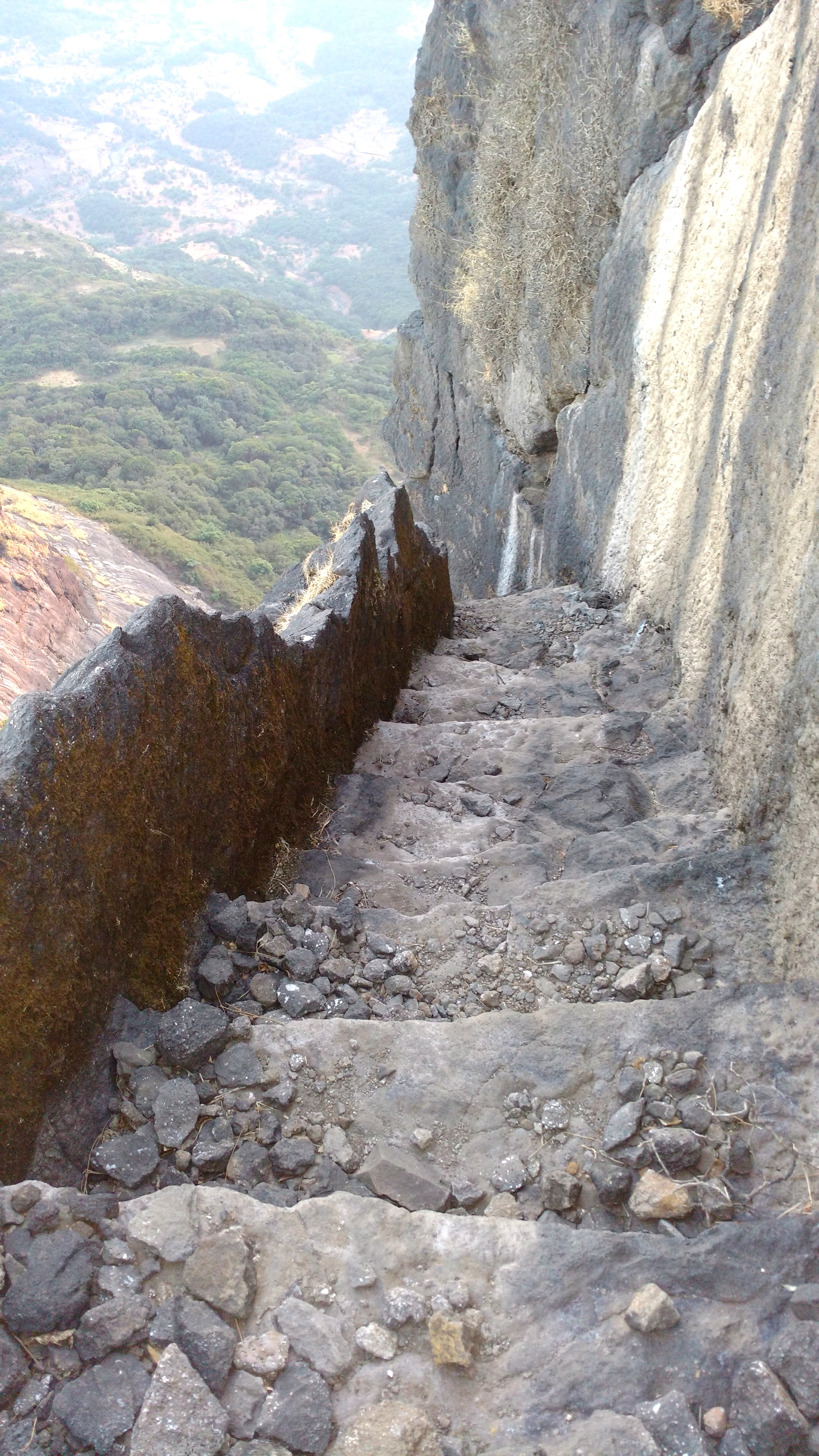
pathways

== Accommodation Facility ==
There is one cave on the fort can accommodate 30 people.

== Food Facility ==
You have to carry with your own. There is absolutely no fire wood on the top.

== Drinking Water Facility ==
Unlike Alang and Kulang, which have around 10 to 15 cisterns each respectively, Madan has only 2 relatively small water cisterns.

== Time To Reach ==
To reach at the top of Madan one has to climb the rock patch which might take time. It takes 2–3 hours to reach at the top of Madan from Alang fort.

== Precautions ==
This trek is not for the beginners or the people who get scared by height. It is better to be tied with sling to common rope while traversing. There are incidences of honey bee attack on the traverse so avoid use of Deo, scent or fragrant soaps and smoking cigarettes.

== See also ==
List of all forts in Maharashtra

- List of forts in Maharashtra
