= Ghatghar =

Coordinates: 19°17′N 73°42′E

Ghatghar is a hill station and small town in the Pune district in the Indian state of Maharashtra. It is a town located at a higher elevation of Deccan Plateau and Naneghat valley. There are two Ghatghar Dams.
