= Ambewadi, Dahanu =

Village in Maharashtra

Ambewadi
- village
- Location in Maharashtra, India Ambewadi (India)
- Coordinates: 20.0336835°N 72.724494°E
- Country: India
- State: Maharashtra
- District: Palghar
- Taluka: Dahanu
- Elevation: 7 m (23 ft)

Population (2011)
  - Total: 1,018
- Time zone: UTC+5:30 (IST)
- 2011 census code: 551588

Ambewadi is a small village in the Igatpuri area of Maharashtra, India. It is located in the ambewadi taluka.

== Demographics ==
According to the 2011 census of India, Ambewadi has 23 households. The effective literacy rate (i.e. the literacy rate of population excluding children aged 6 and below) is 54.9%.

Demographics (2011 Census)
| | Total | Male | Female |
|---|---|---|---|
| Population | 1018 | 528 | 490 |
| Children aged below 6 years | 140 | 67 | 73 |
| Scheduled caste | 4 | 3 | 1 |
| Scheduled tribe | 988 | 512 | 476 |
| Literates | 482 | 280 | 202 |
| Workers (all) | 518 | 304 | 214 |
| Main workers (total) | 509 | 298 | 211 |
| Main workers: Cultivators | 12 | 7 | 5 |
| Main workers: Agricultural labourers | 248 | 126 | 122 |
| Main workers: Household industry workers | 1 | 1 | 0 |
| Main workers: Other | 248 | 164 | 84 |
| Marginal workers (total) | 9 | 6 | 3 |
| Marginal workers: Cultivators | 0 | 0 | 0 |
| Marginal workers: Agricultural labourers | 1 | 0 | 1 |
| Marginal workers: Household industry workers | 0 | 0 | 0 |
| Marginal workers: Others | 8 | 6 | 2 |
| Non-workers | 500 | 224 | 276 |
