= E6 Series Shinkansen =

Japanese high speed train type

E6 series
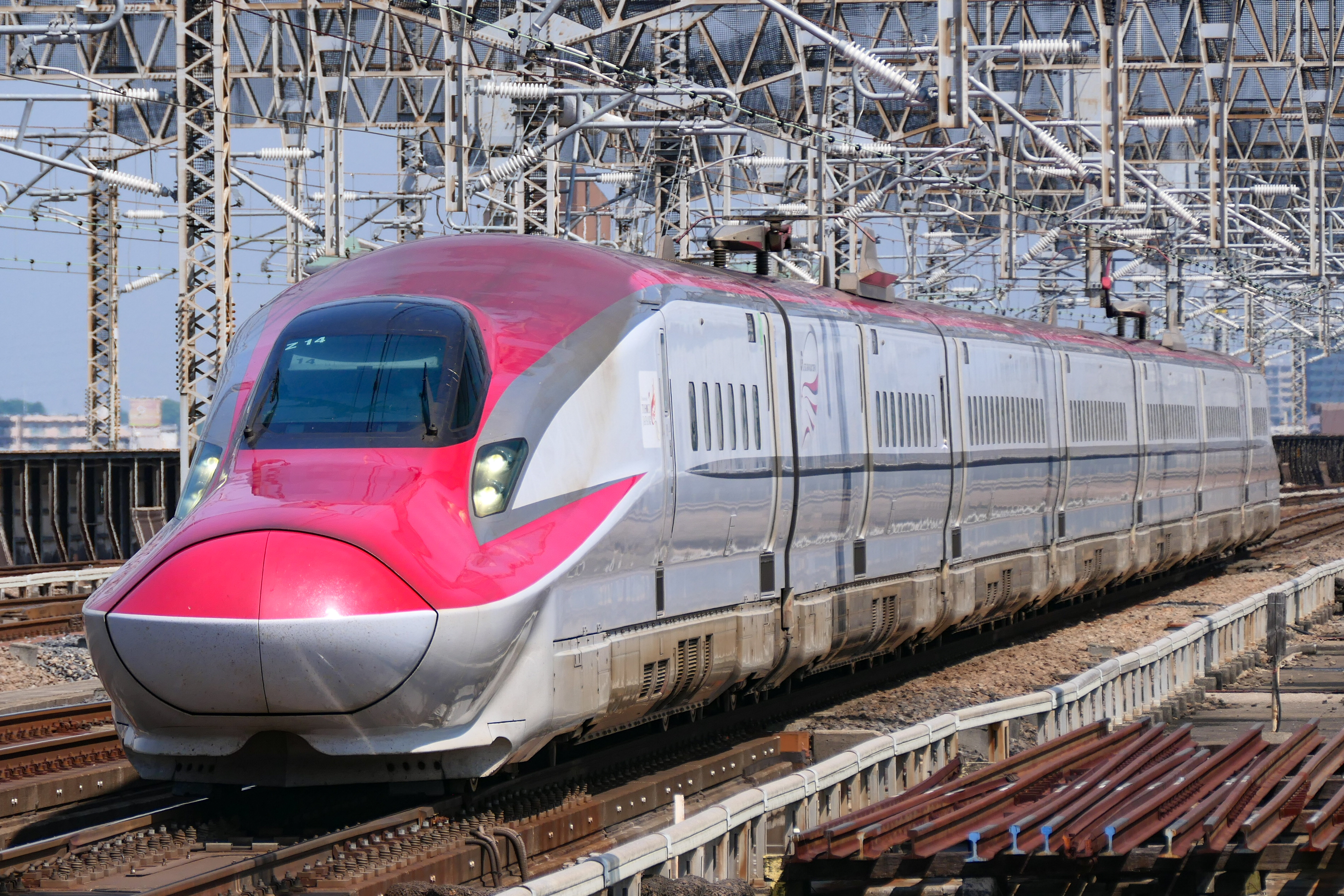
- E6 series set near Omiya Station
- Stock type: Electric multiple unit
- In service: 2013–present
- Manufacturers: Hitachi; Kawasaki Heavy Industries
- Designer: Ken Okuyama
- Family name: Mini-Shinkansen
- Replaced: E3 series
- Constructed: 2010–2014
- Entered service: 16 March 2013; 13 years ago
- Number built: 168 vehicles (24 sets)
- Number in service: 161 vehicles (23 sets)
- Number scrapped: 7 vehicles (1 set; set Z9; earthquake damage)
- Formation: 7 cars per trainset
- Fleet numbers: Z1–Z24
- Capacity: 338 (23 Green + 315 ordinary)
- Operator: JR East
- Depot: Akita
- Lines served: Akita Shinkansen; Tōhoku Shinkansen

Specifications
- Car body construction: Aluminium alloy
- Train length: 148.65 m (487 ft 8 in)
- Car length: End cars: 23.075 m (75 ft 8.5 in); Intermediate cars: 20.5 m (67 ft 3 in)
- Width: 2.945 m (9 ft 7.9 in)
- Height: 3.65 m (12 ft)
- Doors: 1 per side, per car
- Maximum speed: 320 km/h (200 mph)
- Weight: 306.5 t (676,000 lb)
- Traction motors: 20 × 300 kW (400 hp) MT207 AC
- Power output: 6,000 kW (8,000 hp)
- Acceleration: Akita: 1.71 km/(h⋅s) (1.06 mph/s); Tōhoku: 2.0 km/(h⋅s) (1.2 mph/s)
- Electric systems: Overhead line: 25 kV 50 Hz AC; 20 kV 50 Hz AC
- Current collection: Pantograph
- UIC classification: Bo′Bo′+2′2′+Bo′Bo′+Bo′Bo′+Bo′Bo′+2′2′+Bo′Bo′
- Bogies: Motored: DT210; Trailer: TR7009
- Safety systems: DS-ATC, RS-ATC, ATS-P
- Multiple working: Up to two units, E5/H5
- Track gauge: 1,435 mm (4 ft 8 1/2 in) standard gauge

The E6 series (Japanese: E6系) is a Japanese Shinkansen high-speed train type. It operates exclusively on Komachi services on the Akita Shinkansen, a mini-Shinkansen line between Akita and Morioka, at speeds of up to 130 kilometres per hour (81 mph). From Morioka, services continue to and from Tokyo on the Tōhoku Shinkansen, where the train is coupled or uncoupled from a Hayabusa service operated with an E5/H5 series train. Compared with the E3 series it replaced, the E6 series can operate at up to 320 kilometres per hour (200 mph) on the Tōhoku Shinkansen, up from 275 kilometres per hour (171 mph), reducing journey times by an average of 12 minutes. The trains were designed by Ken Okuyama.

A total of 24 seven-car trainsets were built by Hitachi and Kawasaki Heavy Industries between 2012 and 2014. The first set, set S12 (later Z1), was delivered in June 2010.

== Operations ==
The 7-car E6 series trains operate in conjunction with E5 series or H5 series (since March 2016) 10-car trains, initially on just four return services daily from 16 March 2013. They replaced all of the previous E3 series trains on Komachi services by 15 March 2014.

== Design ==
The overall styling was overseen by Japanese industrial designer Ken Okuyama, and is intended to evoke images from the cultural identity of Akita Prefecture, including Namahage demons and kantō festival lanterns.

The body is finished in "Hiun" (飛雲) white, a crimson roof and a "arrow silver" bodyside stripe.

The E6 series features a long, aerodynamically optimized nose to reduce tunnel boom and permit higher operating speeds. The nose is 13 metres (43 ft) long—7 metres (23 ft) longer than that of the E3 series it replaces—allowing E6 series operation on the Tōhoku Shinkansen at speeds increased from 275 to 320 kilometres per hour (171 to 199 mph).

The design incorporates technology developed through the Fastech 360 experimental train and the E5 series, with which the E6 is designed to operate in coupled service on the Tōhoku Shinkansen. Like the E5, the E6 uses an "arrow-line" nose profile, first tested on the Fastech 360, to improve aerodynamic efficiency and reduce noise at high speeds.

Trainsets are formed of seven cars, matching the seating capacity of six-car E3 series sets due to reduced seating in the end cars. All cars are equipped with active suspension to improve ride quality across varying track conditions and active tilting capability of up to 1.5 degrees to improve passenger comfort when operating at higher speeds.

== Formation ==
=== Pre-production set S12 ===
The pre-series train, numbered "S12" (later becoming "Z1"), was formed as follows, with car 11 at the Tokyo end and car 17 at the Morioka end.

Car No.	11	12	13	14	15	16	17
Designation	M1sc	Tk	M1			T	M1c
Numbering	E611	E628	E625	E625-100	E627	E629	E621
Weight (t)	45.7	44.4	42.5	43.1	42.5	44.5	43.8
Seating capacity	23	35	60		68	60	32

- Car 11 provides Green (first class) accommodation.
- Cars 12 and 16 are each fitted with a single-arm pantograph. As with the E5 series, only one pantograph is normally used in service.
- Cars 11 to 14 were built by Kawasaki Heavy Industries, and cars 15 to 17 were built by Hitachi.
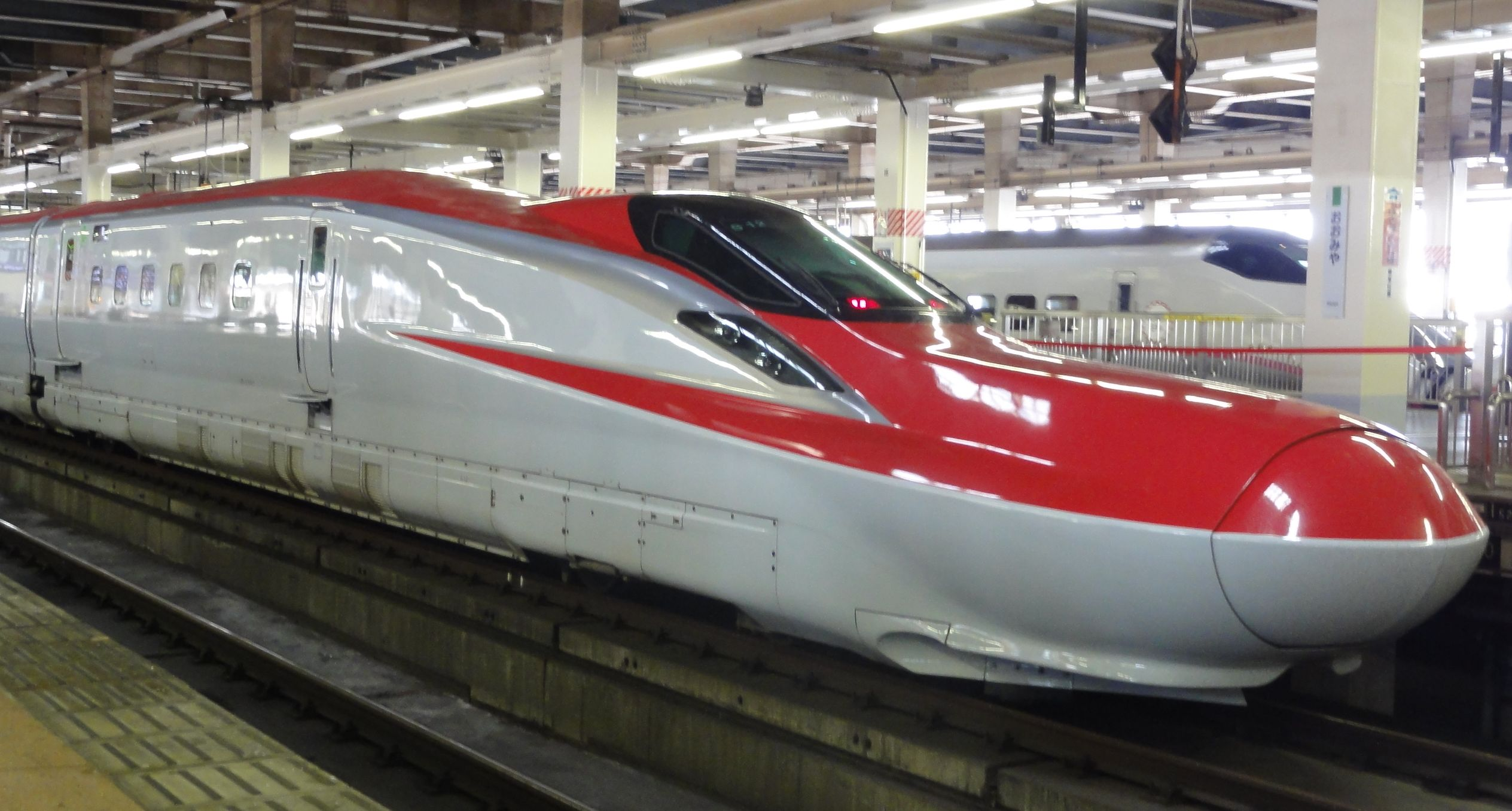
E611-1 (car No. 11)

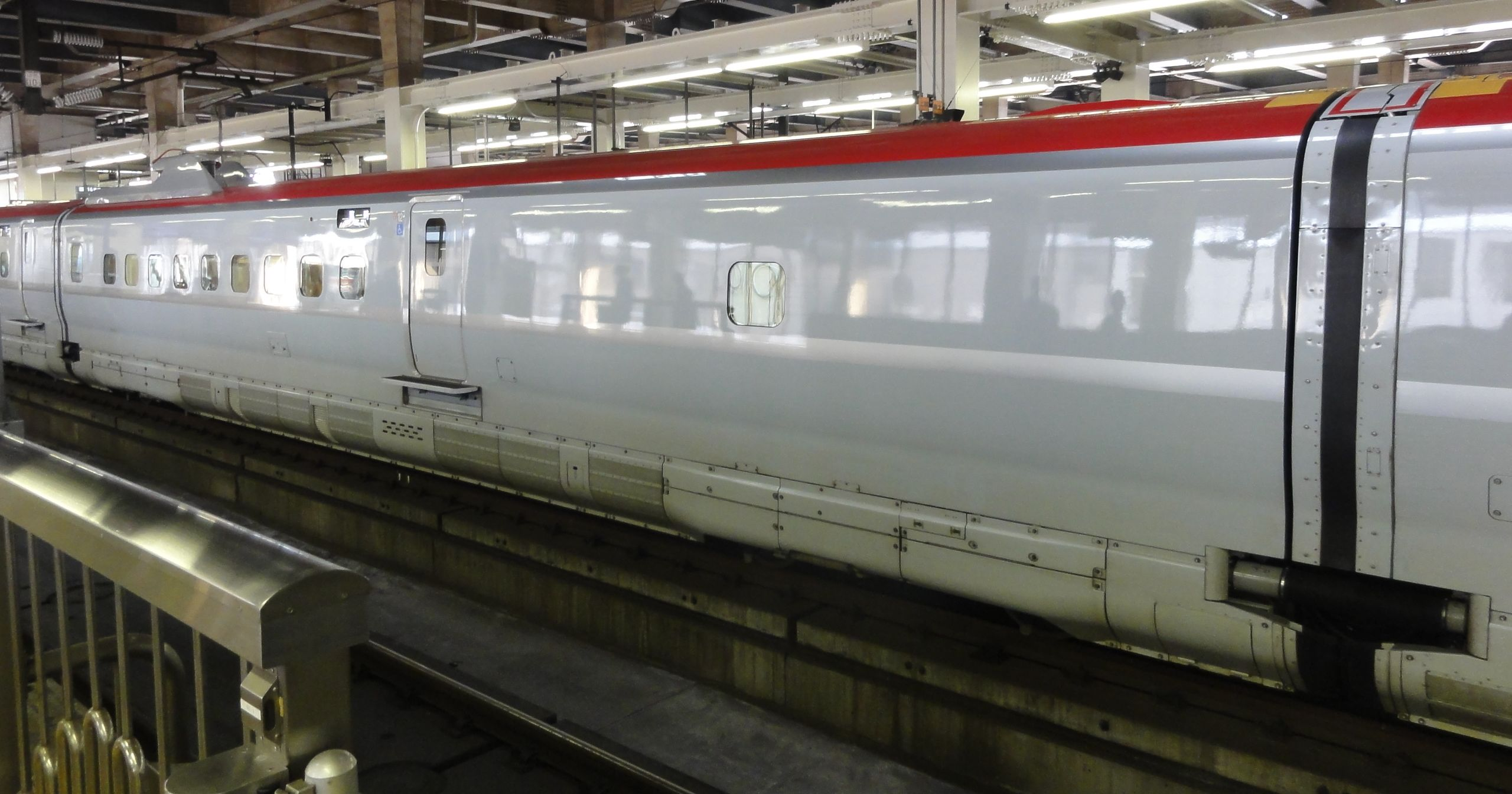
E628-1 (car No. 12)

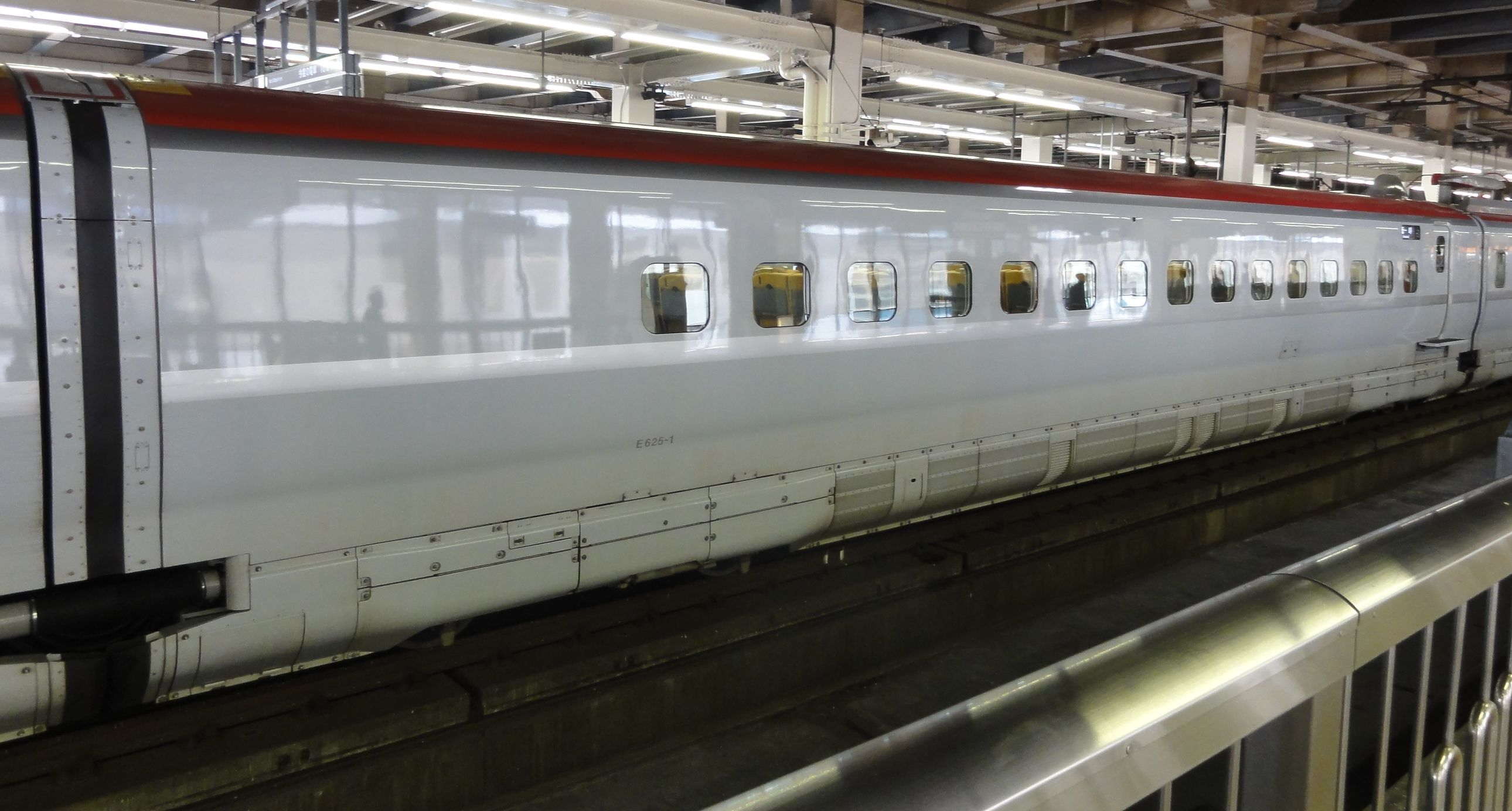
E625-1 (car No. 13)

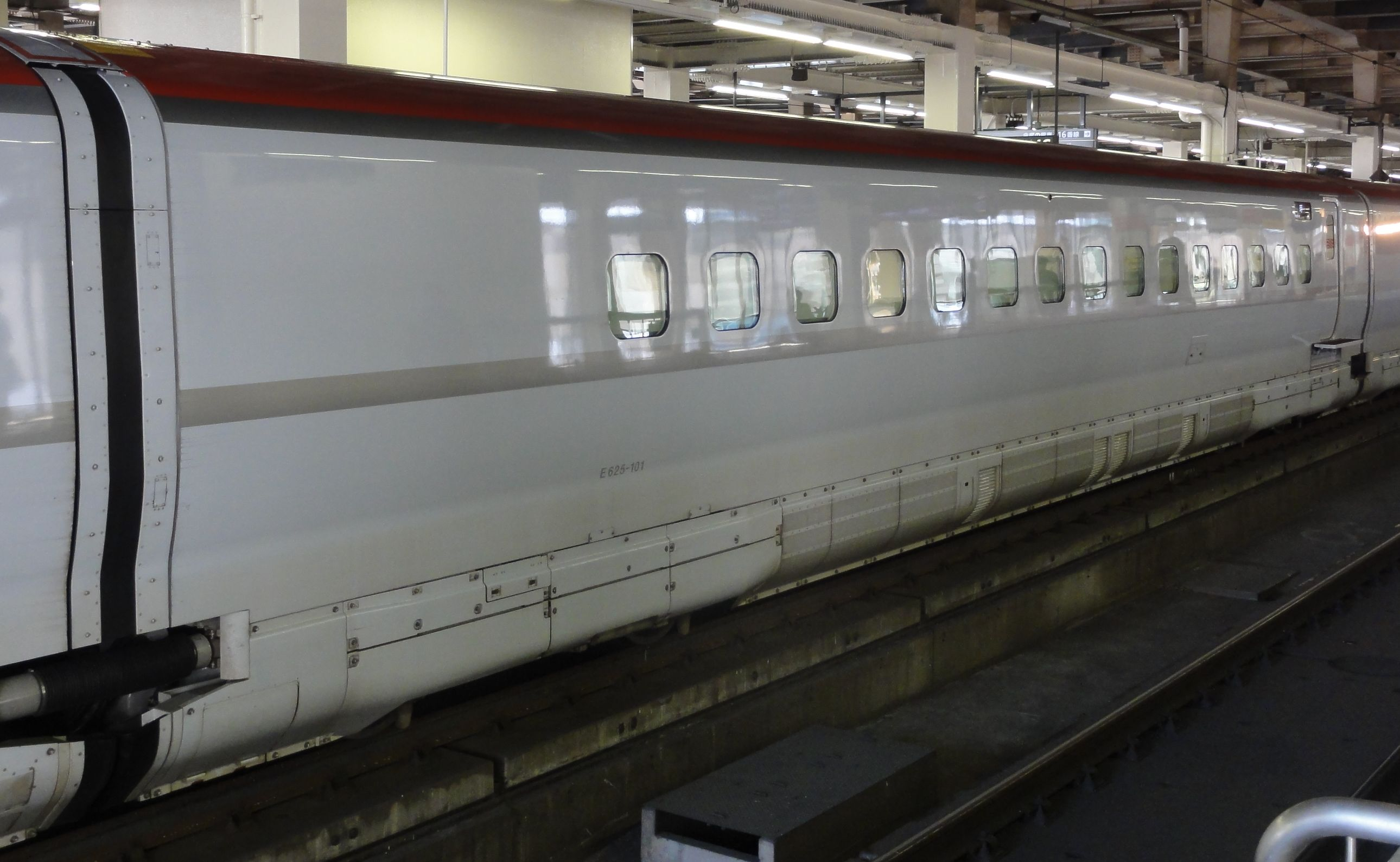
E625-101 (car No. 14)

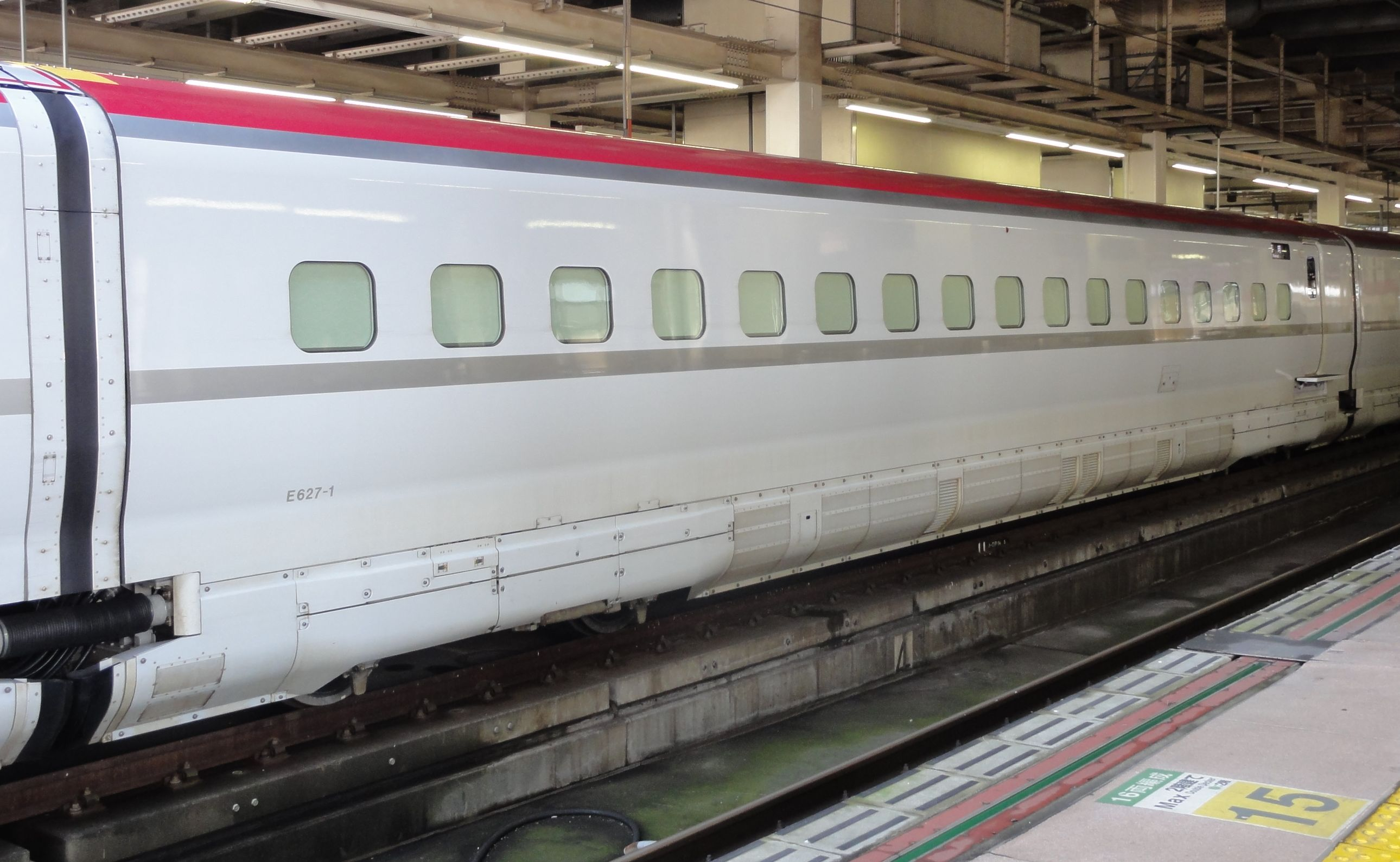
E627-1 (car No. 15)

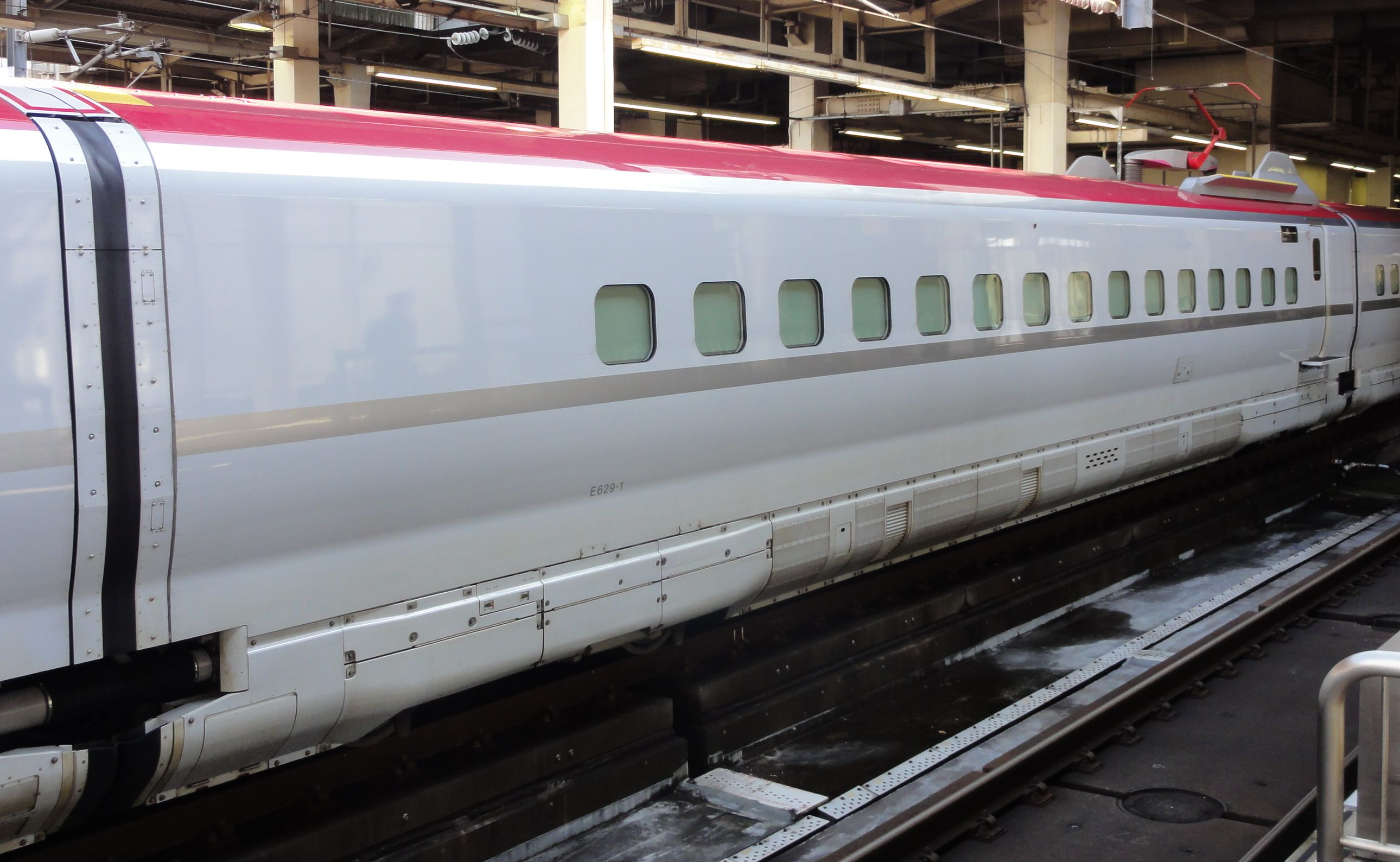
E629-1 (car No. 16)

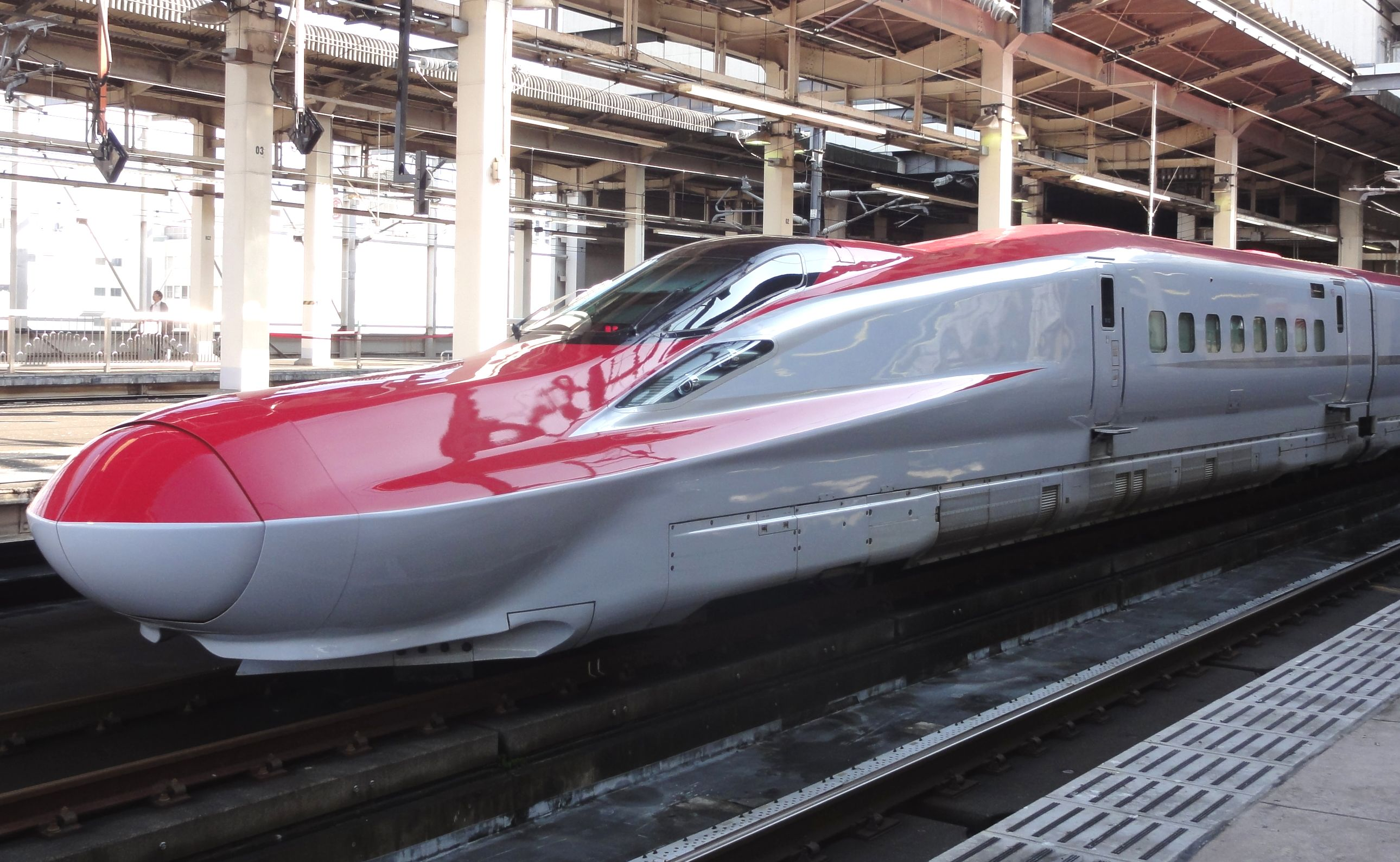
E621-1 (car No. 17)

=== Full-production sets Z2– ===
The full-production trains, numbered "Z2" onward, are formed as follows, with car 11 at the Tokyo end and car 17 at the Morioka end.

Car No.	11	12	13	14	15	16	17
Designation	M1sc	Tk	M1			T	M1c
Numbering	E611	E628	E625	E625-100	E627	E629	E621
Weight (t)	45.1	44.4	41.7	41.8	42.1	44.2	43.4
Seating capacity	22	34	60		68	60	32

- Car 11 provides Green (first class) accommodation.
- Cars 12 and 16 are each fitted with a single-arm pantograph.

== Interior ==
The new trains feature similar improvements to passenger accommodation as featured on the E5 series trains, including AC power outlets, and security cameras in vestibule areas. Seating in both Standard class and Green (first class) cars is in the standard 2+2 arrangement for mini-Shinkansen trains. Seat pitch is 1,160 mm (46 in) in Green class and 980 mm (39 in) in Standard class, the same as for the E3 series trains. Cars 12, 13, 14, and 16 are equipped with toilets. The toilet in car 12 is universal access.

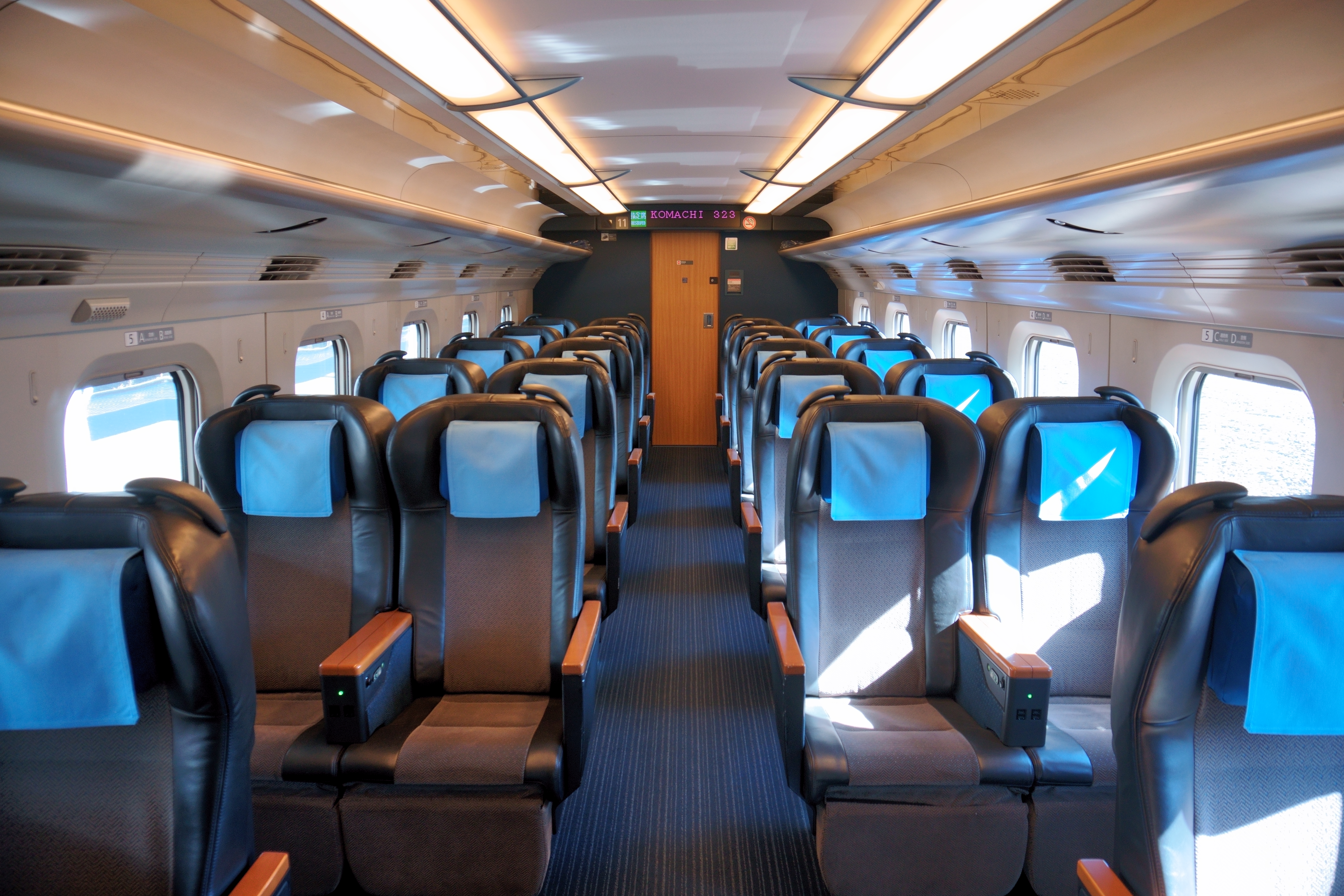
Green-class car (car 11) interior

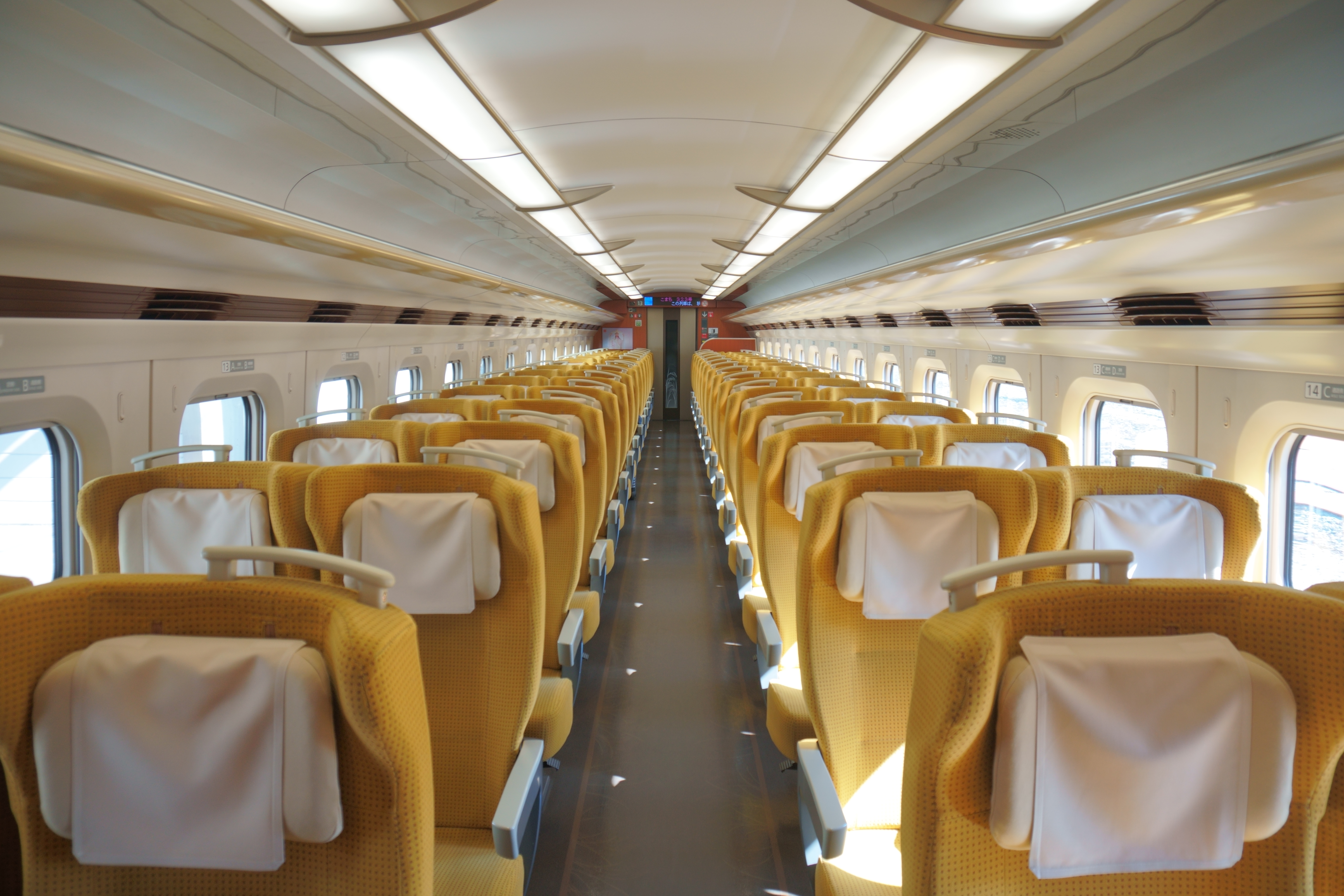
Standard-class car (car 13) interior

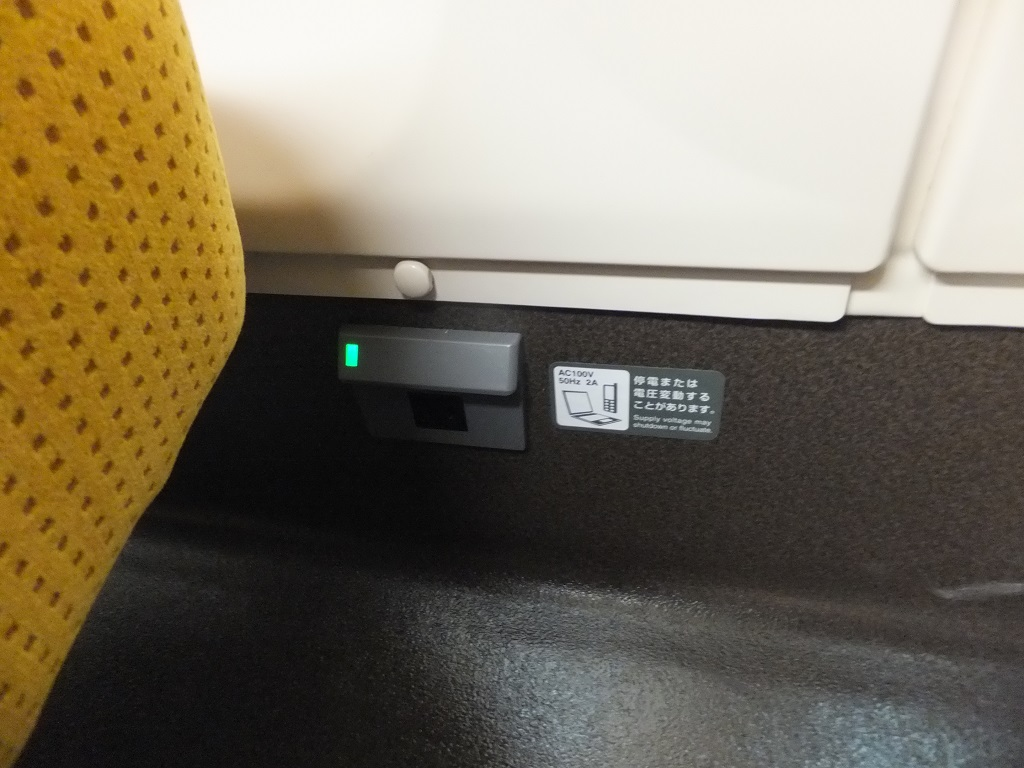
An AC power outlet in a standard-class car

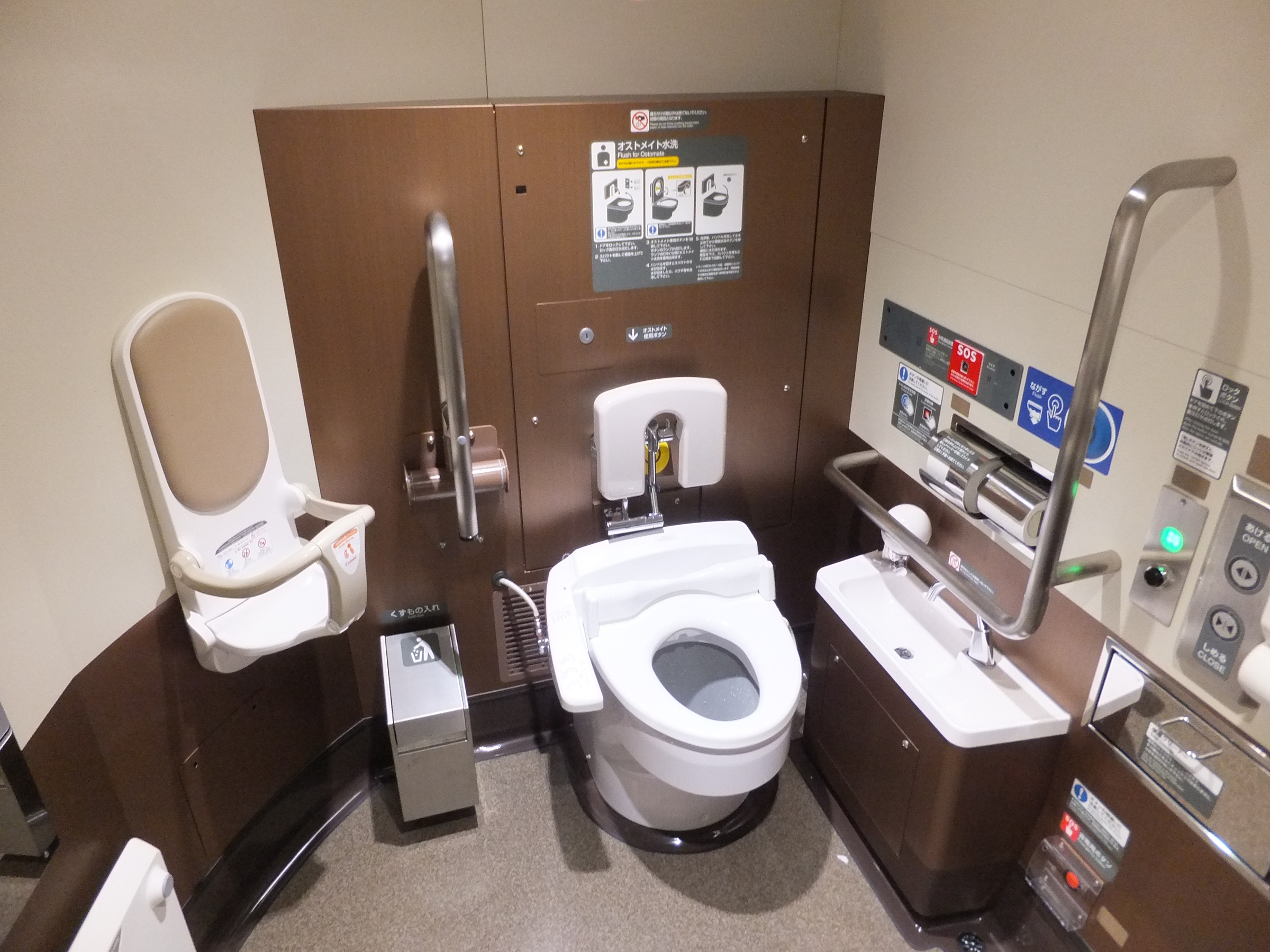
Wheelchair-accessible toilet in car 12

== History ==
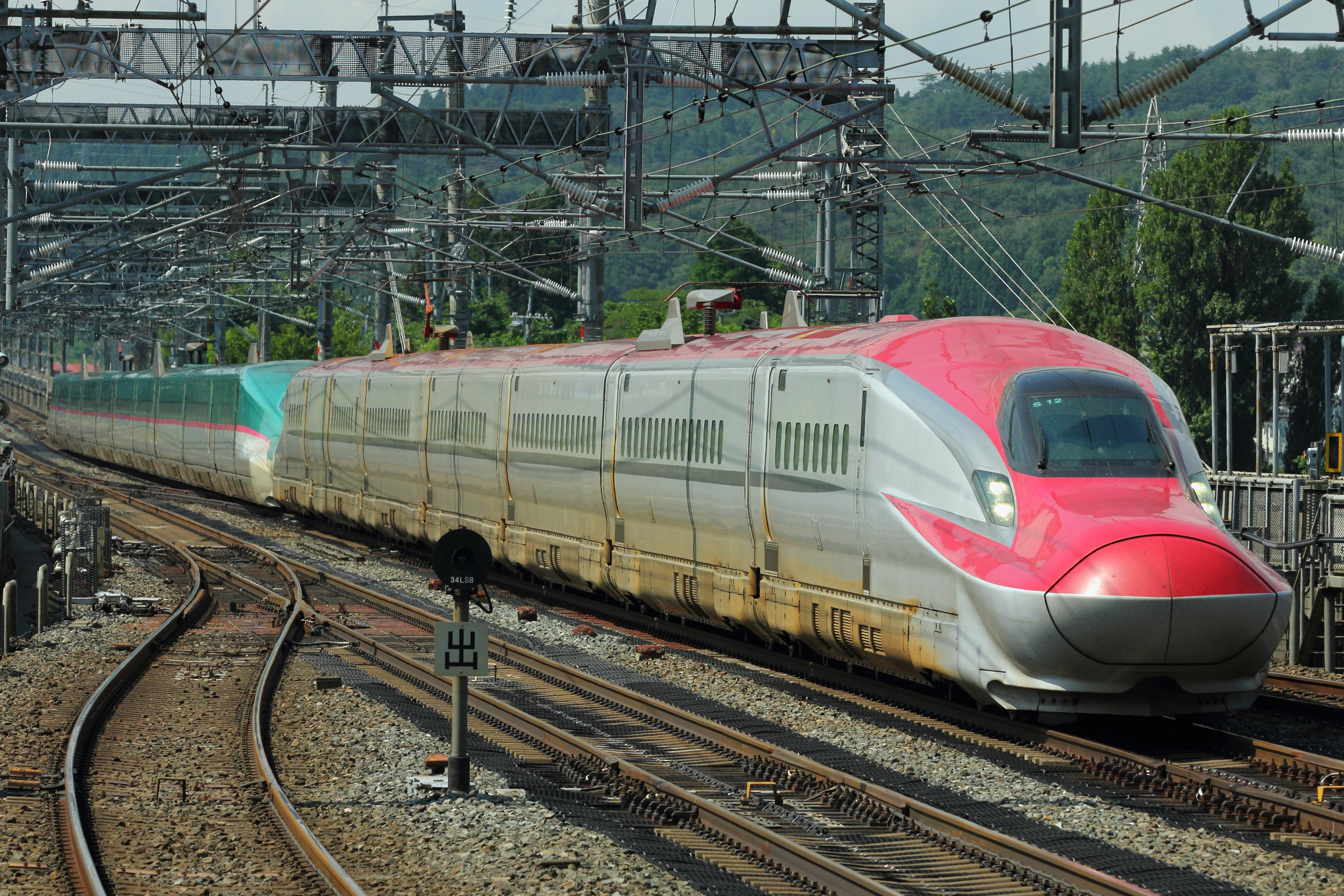
Pre-production set S12 on test with E5 series set S11, July 2012

The pre-series set, S12, was delivered to Sendai Depot in June 2010, and formally accepted by JR East on 8 July. Test running commenced on the Tohoku Shinkansen in July 2010.

The first full-production set was delivered in November 2012, with production continuing until spring 2014.

Revenue service commenced on 16 March 2013 on new Super Komachi services, running at a maximum speed of 300 km/h (185 mph) on the Tohoku Shinkansen. From 15 March 2014, the maximum speed was raised to 320 km/h (200 mph) on the Tohoku Shinkansen, with the maximum speed on the Akita Shinkansen tracks remaining at 130 km/h (80 mph), allowing journey times between Tokyo and Akita to be reduced by an average of 12 minutes. The service name was also returned to simply Komachi.

In May 2014, the E6 series was awarded the 2014 Laurel Prize, presented annually by the Japan Railfan Club. The award presentation ceremony was held at Akita Station on 8 November 2014.

== Fleet list ==
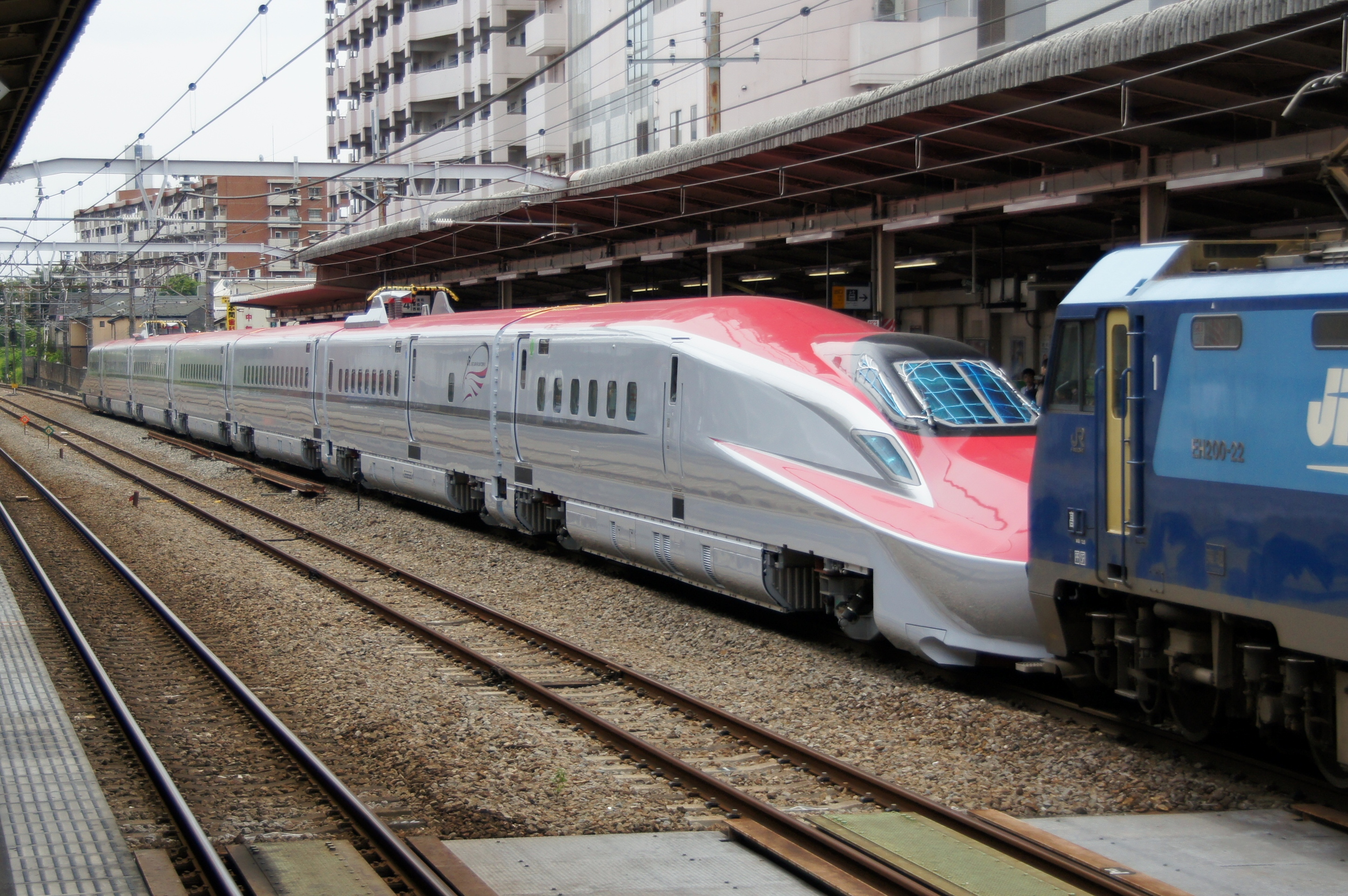
Set Z9 hauled by an EH200 electric locomotive en route from the Kawasaki Heavy Industries factory in Kobe to Akita Depot, June 2013

As of 1 October 2014, 24 sets were in service, as shown below. Set Z9 was withdrawn in April 2022 following damage sustained from the 2022 Fukushima earthquake.

Set number	Manufacturer	Date delivered	Date withdrawn	Remarks
Z1	Hitachi/Kawasaki HI	8 July 2010		Pre-series set, originally numbered S12, modified February 2014
Z2	Kawasaki HI	19 November 2012		Full-production sets
Z3	Kawasaki HI	3 December 2012		Full-production sets
Z4	Hitachi	18 December 2012		Full-production sets
Z5	Hitachi	14 February 2013		Full-production sets
Z6	Kawasaki HI	14 March 2013		Full-production sets
Z7	Kawasaki HI	26 April 2013		Full-production sets
Z8	Kawasaki HI	18 May 2013		Full-production sets
Z9	Kawasaki HI	22 June 2013	April 2022	Withdrawn in April 2022 following damage sustained from the 2022 Fukushima earthquake.
Z10	Hitachi	27 June 2013		Full-production sets
Z11	Kawasaki HI	12 July 2013		Full-production sets
Z12	Hitachi	10 July 2013		Full-production sets
Z13	Kawasaki HI	24 August 2013		Full-production sets
Z14	Hitachi	30 August 2013		Full-production sets
Z15	Kawasaki HI	14 September 2013		Full-production sets
Z16	Hitachi	27 September 2013		Full-production sets
Z17	Kawasaki	9 October 2013		Full-production sets
Z18	Hitachi	25 October 2013		Full-production sets
Z19	Kawasaki	1 November 2013		Full-production sets
Z20	Hitachi	30 November 2013		Full-production sets
Z21	Kawasaki	11 December 2013		Full-production sets
Z22	Kawasaki	21 January 2014		Full-production sets
Z23	Hitachi	13 February 2014		Full-production sets
Z24	Hitachi	3 April 2014		Full-production sets

While the first sets from both Hitachi and Kawasaki Heavy Industries were delivered by sea to Sendai, set Z9 was delivered from the Kawasaki Heavy Industries factory in Kobe by rail to Akita Depot over three days from 31 May to 2 June 2013, mounted on temporary narrow-gauge (1,067 mm gauge) bogies and hauled by freight locomotives. This was followed by set Z11 from 21 to 23 June 2013.

== Accidents and incidents ==
E6 series set Z9, coupled with H5 series set H2 operating as Yamabiko 223 bound for Sendai derailed during the 2022 Fukushima earthquake while traveling between Fukushima and Shiroishi-Zaō stations. There were no injuries on board, but set Z9 was withdrawn from service due to damaged sustained from the earthquake.

== See also ==
- List of high speed trains
