= Shiroishi-Zaō Station =

Railway station in Shiroishi, Miyagi prefecture, Japan

Shiroishi-Zaō Station 白石蔵王駅
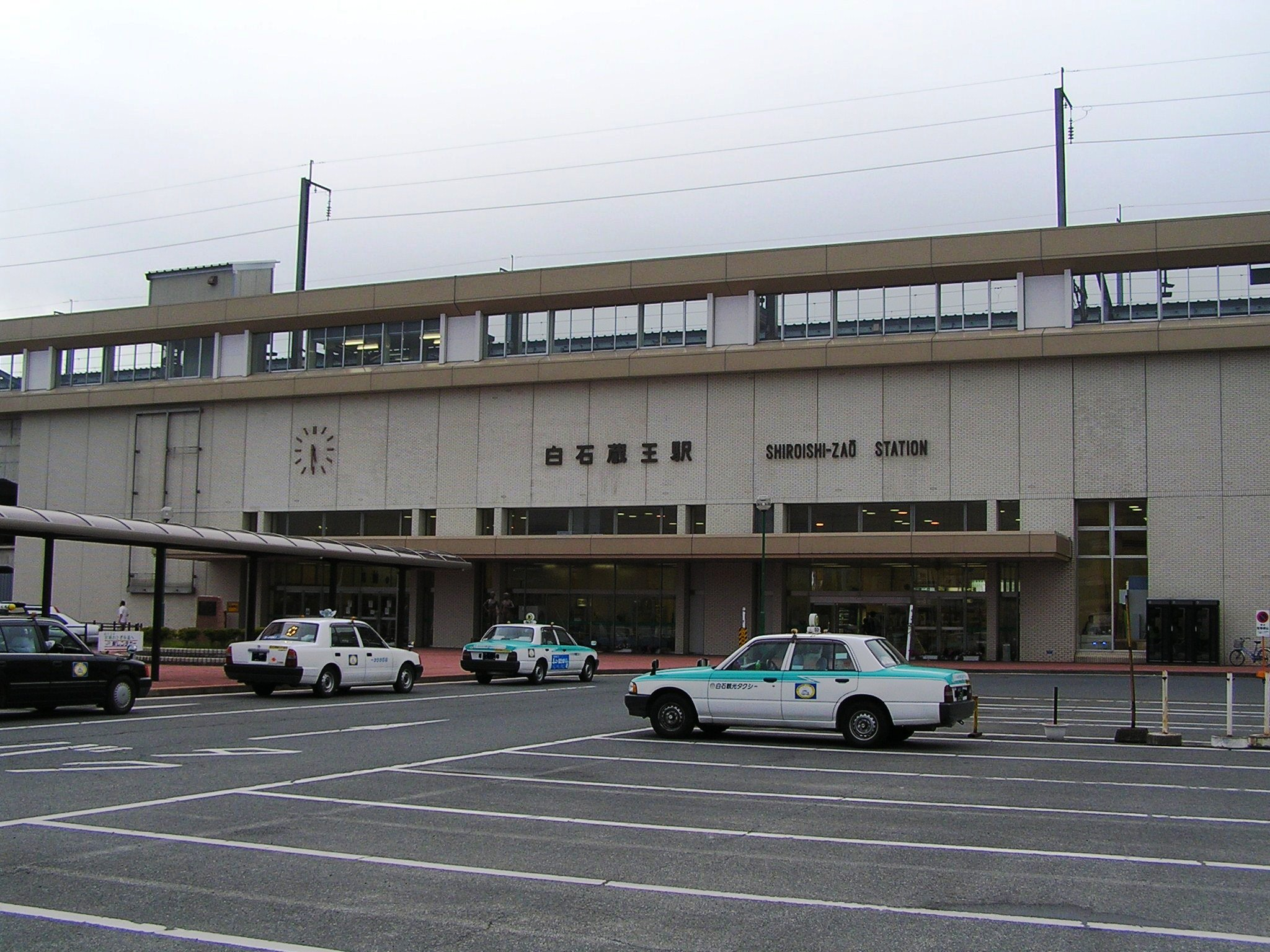
- Shiroishi-Zaō Station, August 2006

General information
- Location: Otakazawa Misawa Sakurada, Shiroishi-shi, Miyagi-ken 989-0213; Japan
- Coordinates: 37.994675°N 140.632596°E
- Operator: JR East
- Line: Tōhoku Shinkansen
- Distance: 286.01 km (177.72 mi) from Tokyo
- Platforms: 1 side platform + 1 island platform
- Tracks: 3

Construction
- Structure type: Elevated

Other information
- Status: Staffed ("Midori no Madoguchi")
- Website: Official website

History
- Opened: 23 June 1982; 44 years ago

Passengers
- FY2018: 874 daily

Services
Preceding station	JR East	Following station
Fukushima towards Tokyo	Tōhoku Shinkansen Yamabiko	Sendai towards Morioka
Location
- Location within Miyagi Prefecture Location within Japan

Shiroishi-Zaō Station (白石蔵王駅, Shiroishi-Zaō-eki) is a railway station in the city of Shiroishi, Miyagi, Japan, operated by JR East.

== Lines ==
Shiroishi-Zaō Station is served by the Tohoku Shinkansen high-speed line from Tokyo to Shin-Aomori, with one Yamabiko service stopping per hour (up to 2 or 3 times per hour at peak times) between Tokyo and Sendai. It is located 286.01 kilometers from Tokyo Station.

== Station layout ==
The station is an elevated station with one island platform and one side platform, with the station building located underneath. The station has a Midori no Madoguchi staffed ticket office.

=== Platforms ===
1	■ Tohoku Shinkansen	for Sendai, and Morioka
2	■ Tohoku Shinkansen	for Utsunomiya and Tokyo
3	■ Tohoku Shinkansen	(spare platform)

== History ==
The station opened 23 June 1982. The station was absorbed into the JR East network upon the privatization of the Japanese National Railways (JNR) on 1 April 1987.

== Passenger statistics ==
In fiscal 2018, the station was used by an average of 874 passengers daily (boarding passengers only).

== Surrounding area ==
- Shiroishi Station (20 minute walk)
- Site of Shiroishi Castle

== See also ==
- List of railway stations in Japan
