= Yamabiko =

Japanese high-speed Shinkansen train service

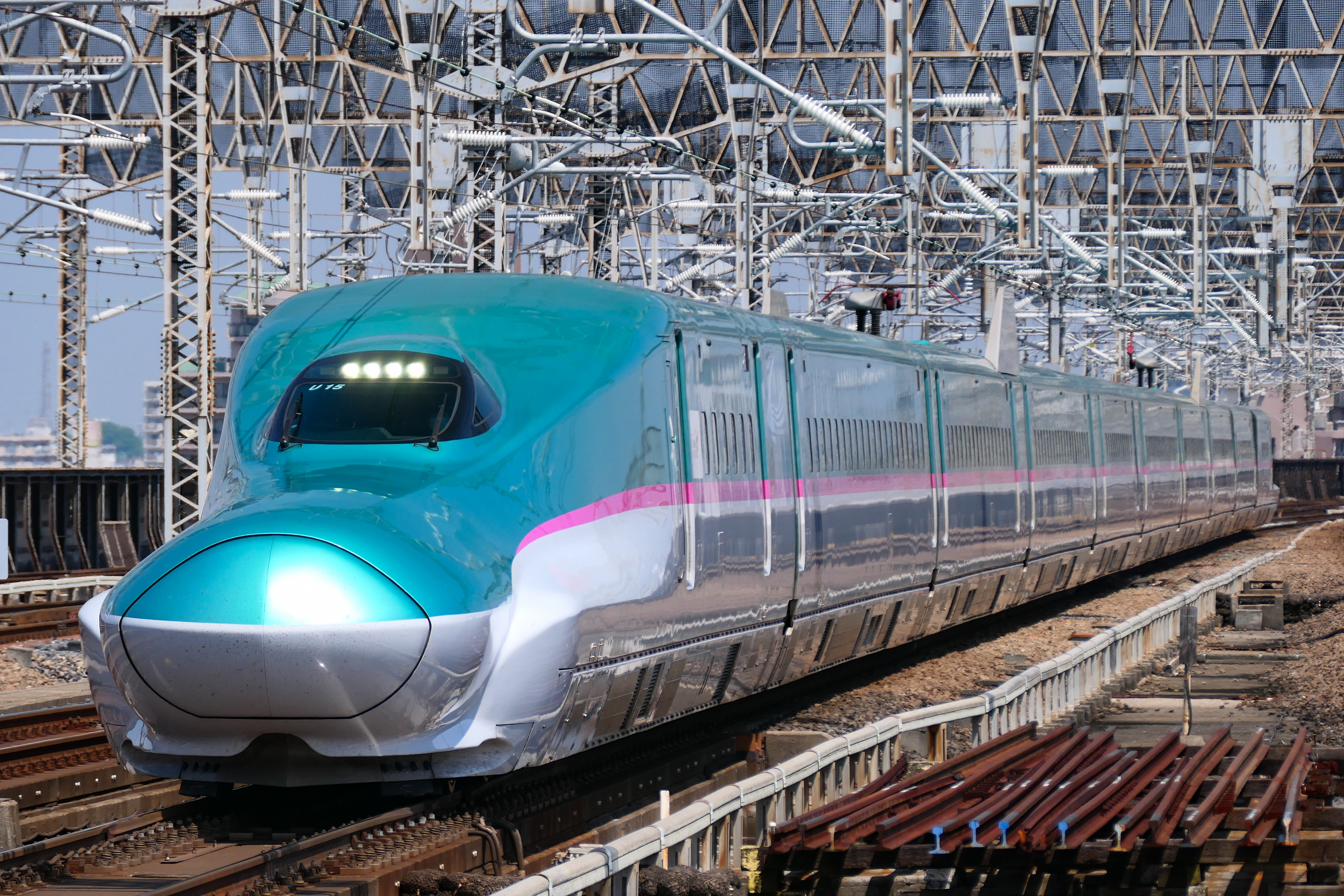
- E5 series set operating a Yamabiko service entering Ōmiya Station, May 2022

Overview
- Service type: Shinkansen (Limited-stop)
- Status: Operational
- Locale: Honshu, Japan
- First service: 1 February 1959 (traditional semi-express service); 23 June 1982 (Shinkansen service)
- Current operator: JR East
- Former operator: Japan National Railway

Route
- Termini: Tokyo; Morioka
- Distance travelled: 496.5 km (308.5 mi)
- Line used: Tōhoku Shinkansen

On-board services
- Classes: Ordinary, Green, Gran Class (Note: Gran Class is only offered on E5 series sets.)
- Seating arrangements: 3+2 (Ordinary car); 2+2 (Green car); 1+2 (Gran Class)

Technical
- Rolling stock: E2 and E5 series
- Track gauge: 1,435 mm (4 ft 8 1/2 in) standard gauge
- Electrification: Overhead line, 25 kV 50 Hz AC
- Operating speed: 275–320 km/h (171–199 mph) (Note: Top speed of 275 km/h (171 mph) when operated with an E2 series set or when coupled to an E3 series set and 300 km/h (190 mph) when coupled to an E8 series set.)
- Track owner: JR East

The Yamabiko (Japanese: やまびこ; lit. 'echo') is a limited-stop high-speed Shinkansen service operated on the Tōhoku Shinkansen between Tokyo and Morioka by East Japan Railway Company (JR East) in Japan.

== Rolling stock ==
- E2 series (since March 1997)
- E5 series (since November 2011)
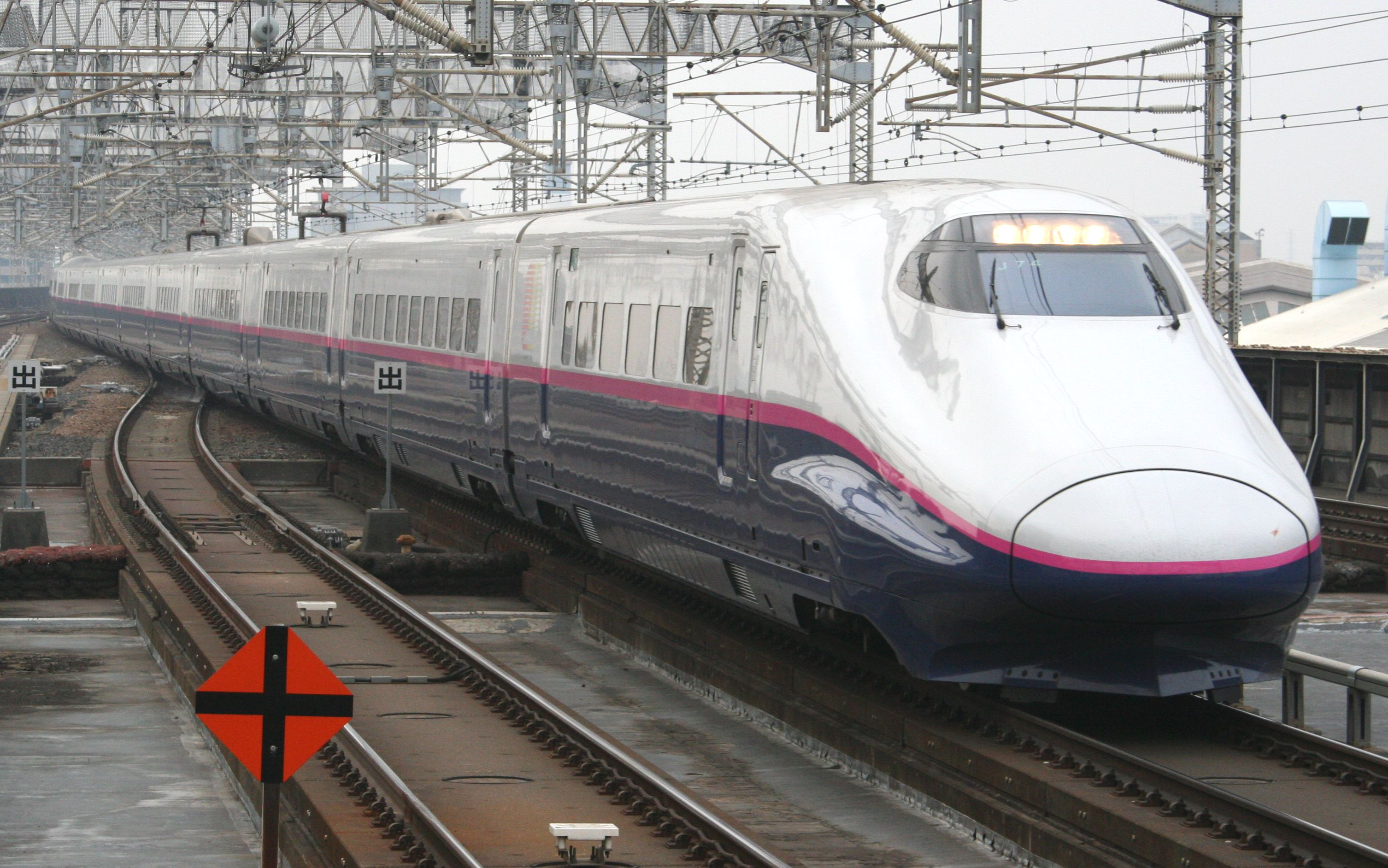
E2 series

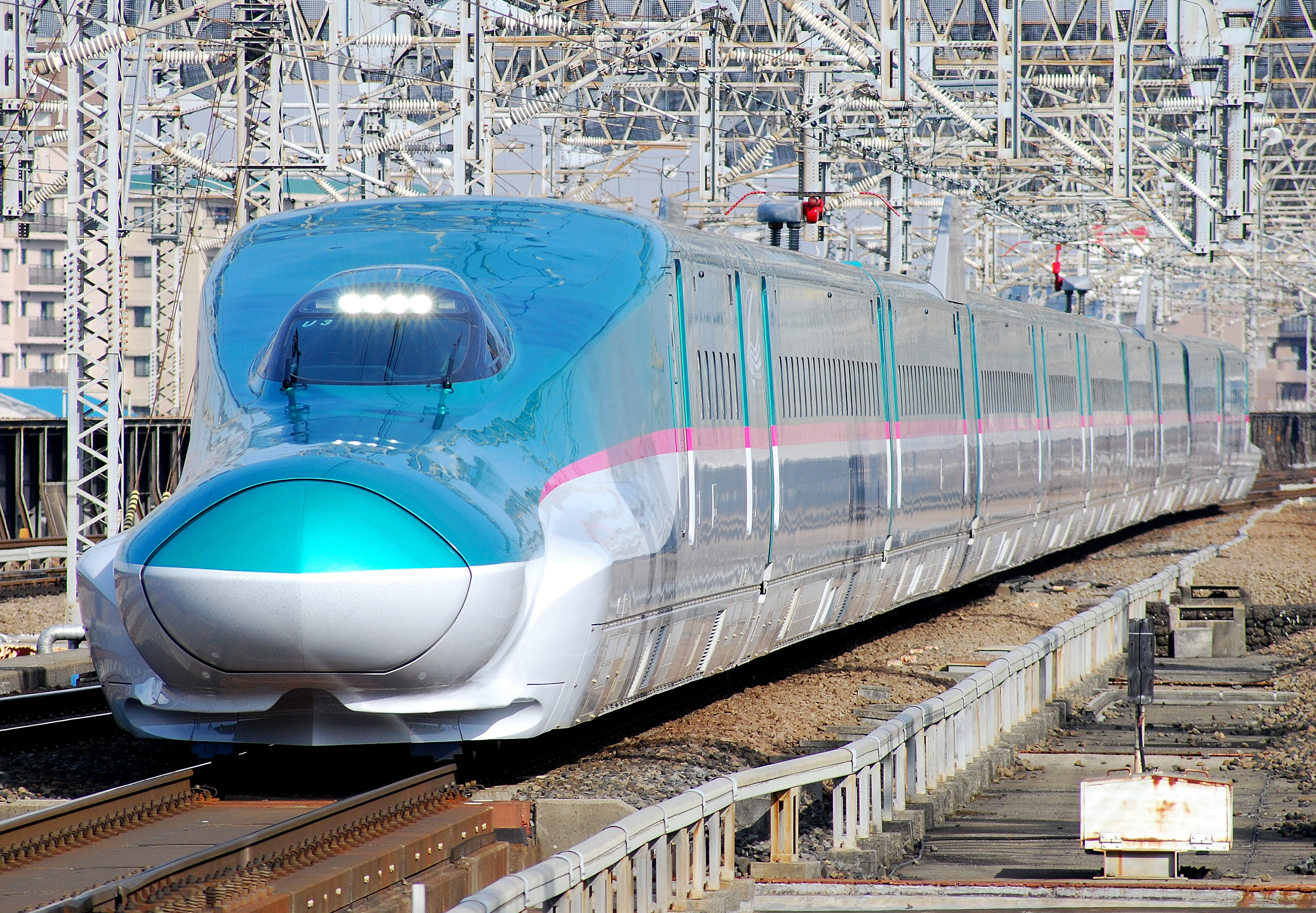
E5 series

=== Former rolling stock ===
- 200 series (23 June 1982 – 16 March 2012)
- E1 series (Max Yamabiko) (15 July 1994 – December 1999)
- E4 series (Max Yamabiko) (20 December 1997 – 28 September 2012)
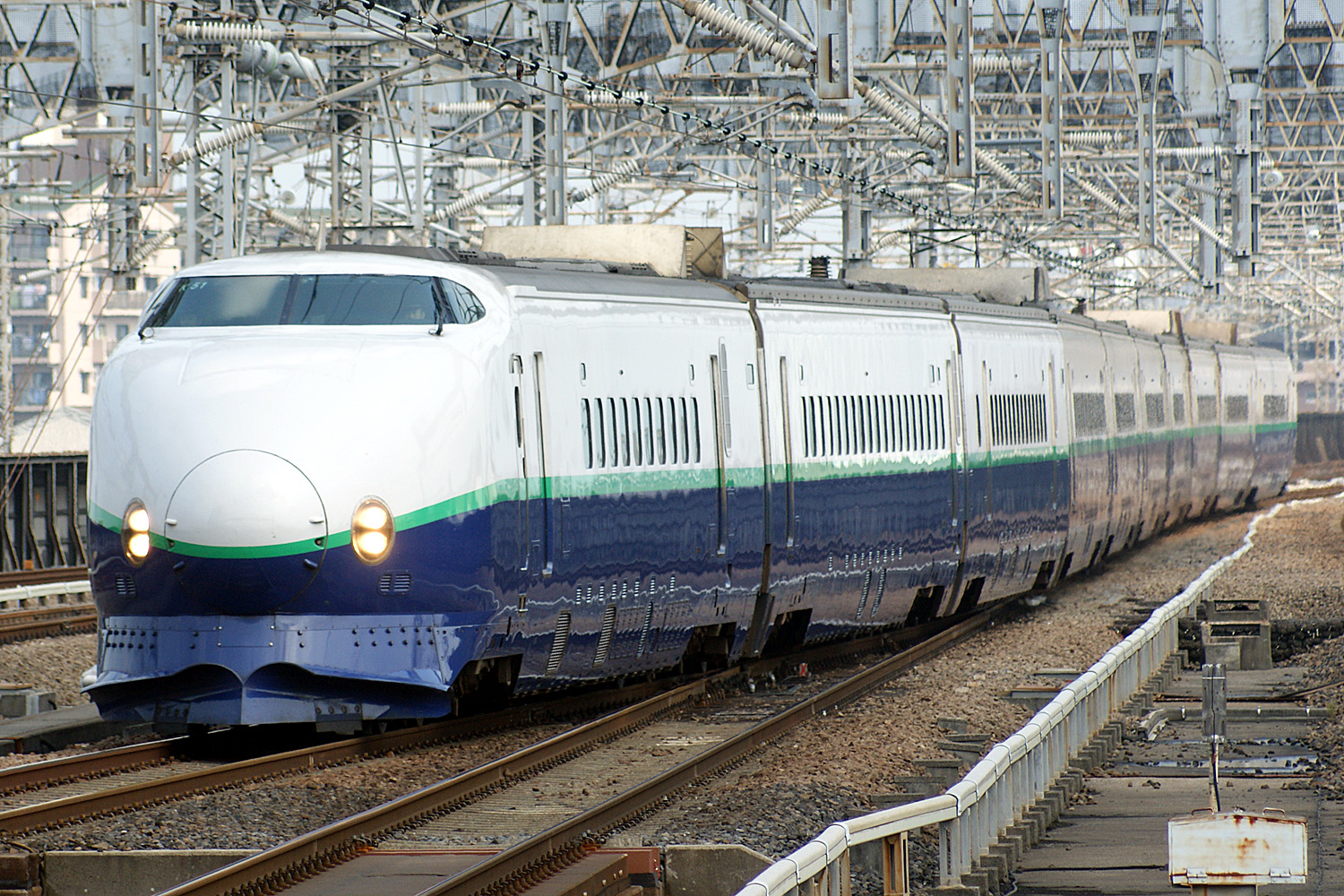
200 series

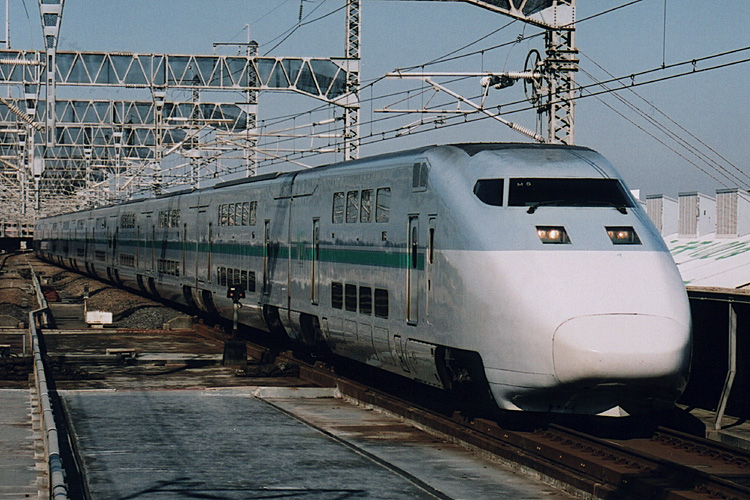
E1 series

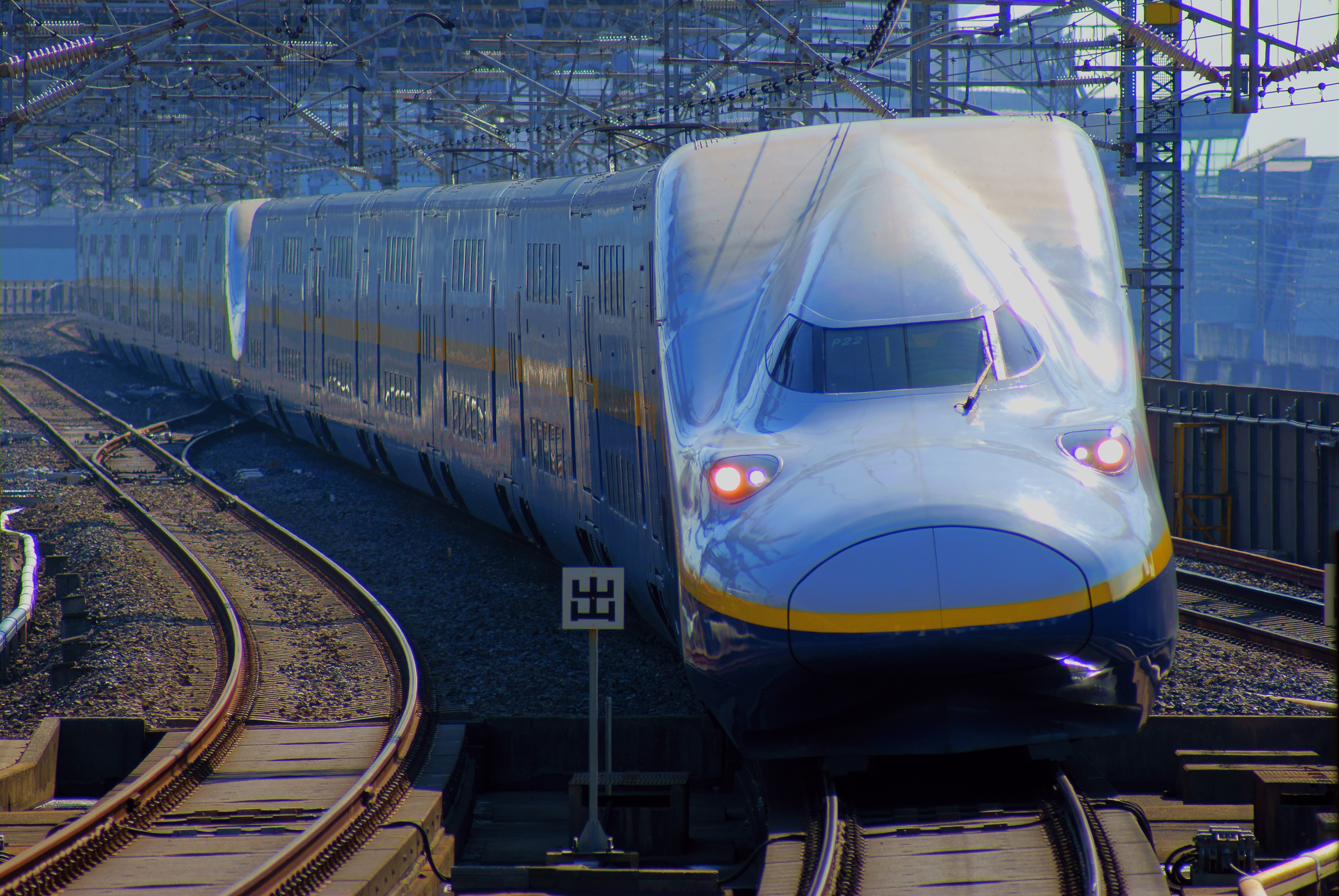
E4 series

== History ==
=== 1959–1963: Semi express ===
On 1 February 1959, the name Yamabiko was introduced on a semi-express (準急, junkyū) service between Fukushima and Morioka on the Tōhoku Main Line. This service operated until 30 September 1963.

=== 1965–1982: Limited express ===
From 1 October 1965, the name was reintroduced for limited express services operating between Ueno in Tokyo and Morioka. These services continued until 22 June 1982, the day before the Tōhoku Shinkansen opened.

=== 1982–Present: Shinkansen ===
From the start of services on the newly opened Tōhoku Shinkansen on 23 June 1982, Yamabiko became the name used for the limited-stop shinkansen services operating initially between Ōmiya and Morioka, later between Ueno and Morioka, and eventually between Tokyo and Morioka.

Since 1 July 1992, some Yamabiko services have run coupled with Tsubasa services (as of 2025 formed of E3 series or E8 Series sets) between Tokyo and Fukushima.

From 19 November 2011, E5 series trainsets were introduced on some Yamabiko services, replacing the remaining 200 series-operated services.

== Special event train services ==
=== Sayonara 200 series Yamabiko ===
On 30 March 2013, a special Sayonara 200 series Yamabiko (さよなら２００系やまびこ号) train operated from Morioka to Tokyo, as a farewell run for the 200 series on Yamabiko services, following the withdrawal of 200 series trains from regular scheduled services on 16 March.

== See also ==
- List of named passenger trains of Japan
