= Anand-Nadiad high-speed railway station =

Railway station in Gujarat, India

Nadiad High-Speed Railway Station

General information
- Location: Uttarsanda, Nadiad, Kheda district, Gujarat, India
- Coordinates: 22.6517°N 72.8834°E
- Elevation: 58 metres (190 ft)
- Operator: National High Speed Rail Corporation Limited
- Line: Mumbai–Ahmedabad high-speed rail corridor
- Platforms: 2
- Tracks: 4

Construction
- Structure type: Elevated
- Parking: Yes

Other information
- Status: Under construction

History
- Opening: 2029
Route map
Key
- Source
Location
- Location within Gujarat Location within India
- Interactive map

Anand-Nadiad High-Speed Railway Station is an under construction high-speed railway station on the Mumbai–Ahmedabad high-speed rail corridor. This station is located near Uttarsanda, close to Nadiad city in Kheda district, Gujarat, India. It is the tenth station of the Mumbai–Ahmedabad high-speed rail corridor, after Vadodara station and before Ahmedabad station. As the station is located between the cities of Anand and Nadiad, it will serve both of them, hence 'Anand-Nadiad' is named together.

== Construction ==
The National High-Speed Rail Corporation Limited (NHSRCL) had invited tenders for Package "C6" of the Mumbai-Ahmedabad high-speed rail corridor (MAHSR) in August 2019, with a deadline of around 4 years. In October 2020, Larsen and Toubro won the tender. The NSHRCL signed an agreement with Larsen and Toubro for the design and construction of the high-speed railway viaduct in Kheda district, two truss bridges, the station and its maintenance depot. In July 2021, Larsen and Toubro and its sub-contractor, Zed Geotechnics and Construction, began construction on the station, after acquiring 17.75 hectares of land near Uttarsanda. The station is slated to be completed by December 2024 and open by August 2026, the time also slated for opening of the Gujarat section of the high-speed rail corridor.

== Lines ==
The station will be served by the Mumbai–Ahmedabad high-speed rail corridor, and will be the tenth station of the Mumbai–Ahmedabad high-speed rail corridor in between Anand and Nadiad.

== Structure ==
The station will have two platforms and two tracks for regular services. It will have three levels–the platform, concourse and service floor as the entrance level. The design of the station will be inspired by Anand's recognition as the 'Milk City of India' ; owing to its base of Amul, the abbreviation for Anand Milk Union Limited, which originated during Operation Flood in the 1970s. The station area will have 2 platforms of 425 m (1,394 ft) length for 16-coach E5 Series Shinkansen trains.

== Features ==
The station will have all modern and advanced facilities and amenities for customers and passengers, distinct from Indian Railway stations and similar to airports. Its design has been made to accommodate sufficient space for passenger movement and amenities at the concourse and platform areas. There will be ticketing and waiting areas, a business-class lounge, a nursery, restrooms, smoking rooms, information booths, retail centres and a public information and announcement system. Moreover, skylight provisions will be present on the roof and exterior sides for natural lighting and reduced energy usage. The station will be developed as a transport hub through integration with all basic modes of transportation for better, faster and hassle-free connectivity to and from the station, such as autos, buses and taxis. Such features will be available in all 12 stations of the Mumbai-Ahmedabad high-speed rail corridor.

== Maintenance depot ==
The station will have one of the three planned maintenance depots, out of Virar and Vapi depots. Unlike conventional depots, these depots will be relatively smaller in size and will be used only for trainsets' maintenance and repairing related works. It will be located south of the station near Bhumel. The depot will have all modern facilities similar to Shinkansen train depots in Japan, such as an elaborate rainwater harvesting system, waste and effluent management system, automatic cleaners, among many other advanced systems. All depots of the Mumbai-Ahmedabad high-speed rail corridor will have such features. Construction began on the depot in May 2022, after acquiring around 7.5 hectares of land along the Mumbai–Ahmedabad main line towards west near Bhumel, being constructed by Larsen and Toubro. It is part of the high-speed rail corridor project's Package "T-3", which was awarded to Larsen and Toubro by the National High-Speed Rail Corporation Limited (NHSRCL) in March 2022. The depot is also slated to be completed by the time of the station's completion.

== Land acquisition issues ==
When the National High Speed Rail Corporation Limited (NHSRCL) began land acquisition for the station and the high-speed railway viaduct in Kheda district, they were met with multiple subjugations from farmers in the region because of not only losing their land but also the fear of not getting sufficient compensation from NHSRCL, thus fearing them of losing their livelihoods as a whole. The main reasons for which the farmers objected were first, that none of them were informed about their lands to be taken to give way for the high-speed rail project, and found that the NHSRCL officials had erected pillars on their farmlands arbitrarily. Such a division divided many farms into unequal halves, leading to the fear of rendering the lands uncultivable because a majority of the healthier areas of the lands that gave more yield would go into the project. The second reason was that the farmers felt ignored by the government and the NHSRCL because their opinions were not being taken seriously as was expected. Any debate regarding how the project would affect the farmers, their farmlands and how it would benefit the farmers during and after the project's execution was also not done. Owing to these problems, the farmers resented to give away their lands for the project to be executed, and vowed not to allow the land acquisition to progress unless their objections taken on the main stage. Officials from the Japan International Cooperation Agency (JICA), the main funding agency of the Mumbai-Ahmedabad high-speed rail corridor project, met farmers to take up their opinions, and raised a serious concern to the NHSRCL and Indian Railways regarding land acquisition and its impacts on farmers to execute the project in a free environment. Finally, NHSRCL, Indian Railways, the central and state governments reached a consensus on providing rehabilitation facilities and paying all farmers in the entire Gujarat section of the Mumbai-Ahmedabad high-speed rail corridor not only a fair but a double compensation for their livelihoods to be sustained, and hence, the problem got resolved on time and did not lead to delay in land acquisition and execution of the project.

== Connectivity ==
=== Road ===
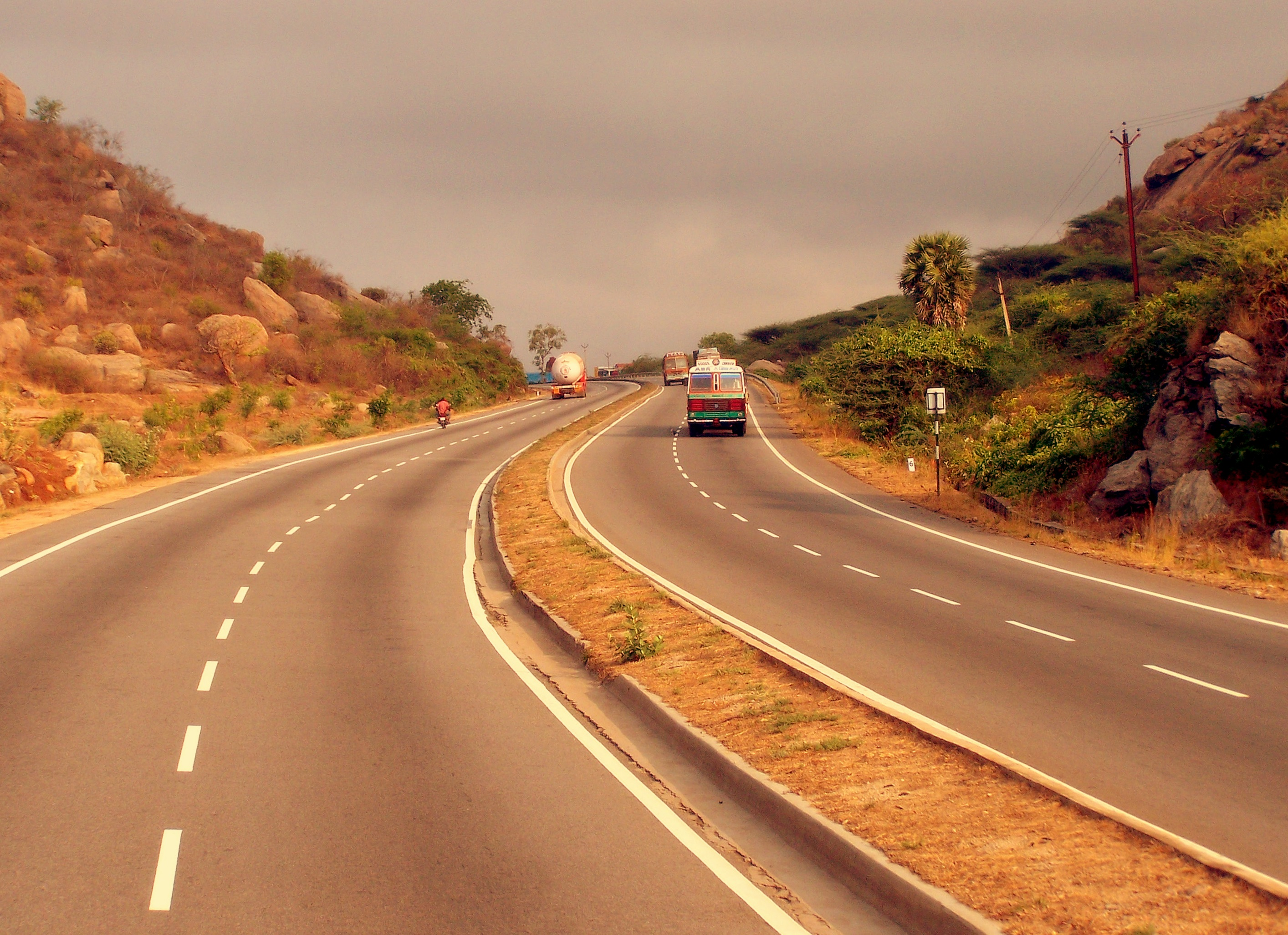
Golden Quadrilateral

The station is being built just 500 m (1,600 ft) away towards north-east from the Golden Quadrilateral. Because of this location, it will be accessible easily from Anand and Nadiad. The existing road connecting Uttarsanda railway station to the Golden Quadrilateral will be upgraded to provide connectivity to both the stations. Most of the stations being built in the Gujarat section of the Mumbai–Ahmedabad high-speed rail corridor are located near or next to state or national highways, in order to provide better and direct connectivity to the stations.

=== Rail ===
The nearest railway station after the station's completion will be Uttarsanda railway station, located around 1.5 km (0.93 mi) east from the station, while the nearest major will be Nadiad Junction railway station, located around 10 km (6.2 mi) north from the station, and Anand Junction railway station located 16 km (9.9 mi) south-east from the station.

=== Air ===
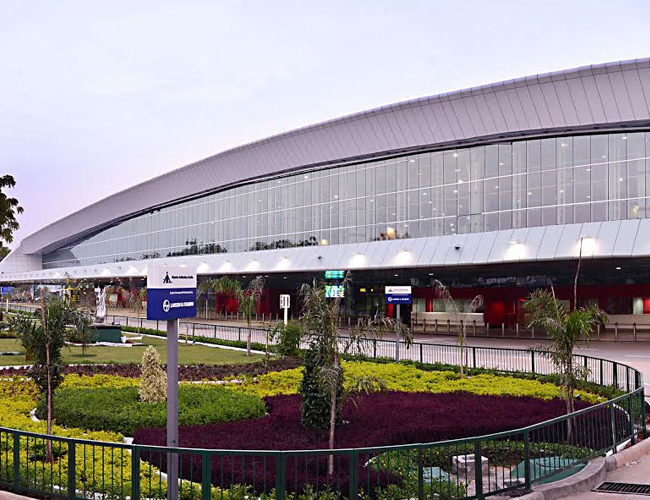
Vadodara Airport

The nearest airport after the station's completion will be Vadodara Airport, located 54 km (34 mi) south-east from the station, while Sardar Vallabhbhai Patel International Airport at Ahmedabad is located 70 km (43 mi) north from the station.

== See also ==
- High-speed rail in India
- Nadiad
- Anand
- Amul
- Operation Flood
- Mumbai-Ahmedabad high-speed rail corridor
- National High Speed Rail Corporation Limited
