= Thane high-speed railway station =

Under-construction high-speed railway station in Maharashtra, India

General information
- Location: Dativali, Diva, Thane , Maharashtra, India
- Coordinates: 19.1890°N 73.0594°E
- Elevation: 24 metres (79 ft)
- Operator: National High Speed Rail Corporation Limited
- Line: Mumbai–Ahmedabad high-speed rail corridor
- Platforms: 2
- Tracks: 4
- Connections: Diva Junction

Construction
- Structure type: Elevated
- Parking: Yes

Other information
- Status: Under construction

History
- Opening: 2029
Route map
Key
- Source
Location
- Location within Maharashtra Location within India
- Interactive map

Thane high-speed railway station is an under-construction high-speed railway station on the Mumbai–Ahmedabad high-speed rail corridor. This station is located near Dativali in Diva, Thane , Maharashtra, India. It is the second station of the Mumbai–Ahmedabad high-speed rail corridor, after Mumbai BKC station and before Virar station. The station will have the first depot of the high-speed rail corridor, located just north of it near Bhiwandi.

== Construction ==
The National High-Speed Rail Corporation Limited (NHSRCL) had invited tenders for Package "C3" of the Mumbai-Ahmedabad high-speed rail corridor (MAHSR) in November 2022, with a deadline of around 4.5 years. In June 2023, Larsen and Toubro won the tender. The NSHRCL signed a letter of agreement (LoA) with Larsen and Toubro for the design and construction of Thane, Virar and Boisar stations in July 2023, while the design and construction of the Thane depot was awarded to DRA–DMRC (JV) in December 2023, as part of Package "D1" of the project, whose bids were invited by NHSRCL in December 2022. The land acquisition of 79 hectares near Datiwali railway station in Diva Gaon began in 2021, and was completed in March 2024, marking the completion of the land to be acquired for the entire Mumbai–Ahmedabad high-speed rail corridor. Hence, construction on both the station and the depot began from the same month, and are expected to be completed by the first half of 2028, the time also slated for the completion of the Maharashtra section of the corridor.

== Lines ==
The station will be served by the Mumbai–Ahmedabad high-speed rail corridor, and will be the second station of the Mumbai–Ahmedabad high-speed rail corridor in Diva Gaon, Thane district. It is also planned to have the branch line towards Nagpur to the east as part of the Mumbai–Nagpur high-speed rail corridor.

== Structure ==
The station will have two platforms and four tracks for regular services and rapid-high-speed services, with a provision of adding two more for each in the future. The concourse and the service areas will be separated from the platform area, as a separate building and a separate elevated section on the high-speed railway viaduct. The buildings will be connected with each other by an access corridor. The station's design will be inspired by the waves of the Arabian Sea and the natural environment of the Western Ghats. The station area will have 2 platforms of 425 m (1,394 ft) length for 16-coach E5 Series Shinkansen trains.

== Features ==
The station will have all modern and advanced facilities and amenities for customers and passengers, distinct from Indian Railway stations and similar to airports. Its design has been made to accommodate sufficient space for passenger movement and amenities at the concourse and platform areas. There will be ticketing and waiting areas, a business-class lounge, a nursery, restrooms, smoking rooms, information booths, retail centres and a public information and announcement system. Moreover, skylight provisions will be present on the roof and ceilings for natural lighting and reduced energy usage. The station will be developed as a transport hub through integration with all basic modes of transportation for better, faster and hassle-free connectivity to and from the station, such as autos, metro, buses and taxis. Such features will be available in all 12 stations of the Mumbai-Ahmedabad high-speed rail corridor.

== Thane depot ==
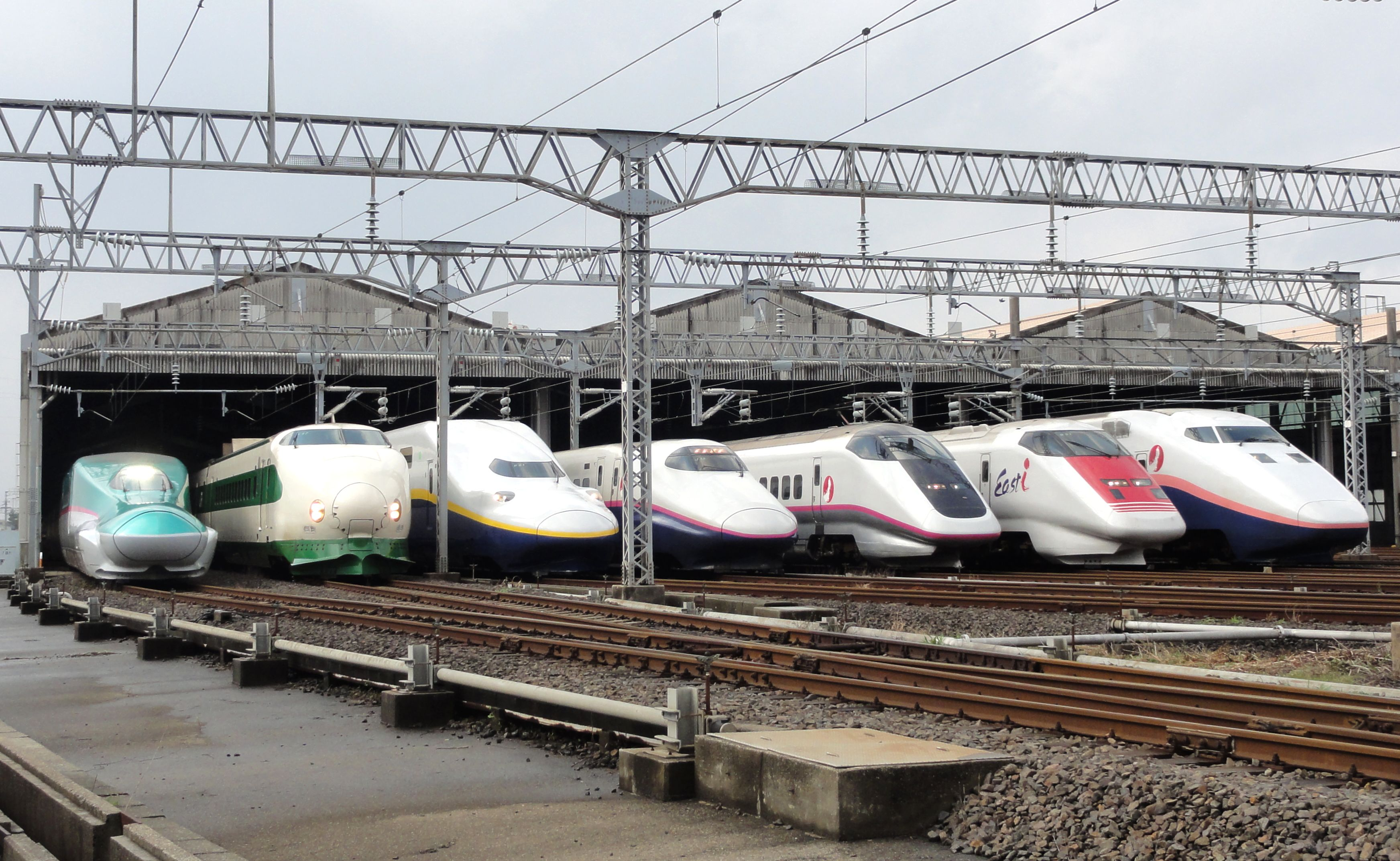
The depot is being constructed on the lines of Shinkansen train depots of Japan, such as the Niigata depot shown here.

The depot is one of the four planned depots of the Mumbai-Ahmedabad high-speed rail corridor, after Vapi, Surat and Sabarmati depots, out of which the depot at Thane to be built near Bhiwandi is the first. It will have all modern and advanced facilities like the Shinkansen, such as maintenance and cleaning of train sets, with inspection bays, washing plants, stabling lines, etc. Initially, four inspection lines and 10 stabling lines will be constructed, which will be increased to eight and 31 respectively in the future.

The drainage systems have been planned particularly, taking into account of the fact that Thane receives heavy rainfall. An elaborate rainwater harvesting system has been proposed to collect rainwater and store it in underground storage tanks within the depot premises for use. A small maintenance depot for the stabling of the inspection and maintenance vehicles and material for the maintenance of the track, bridges and overhead equipment infrastructure has also been planned to set up.

=== Features ===
The depot will have the following features similar to Shinkansen train depots of Japan:

- It will have a well-planned layout, modern architectural designs, proper ventilation, natural lighting and noise and dust pollution controls.
- Sewage and effluent generated from trainsets and within the depot will be treated and recycled in modern sewage and effluent treatment plants.
- The recycled water will meet almost 70% of the overall depot's water requirement.
- Garbage will be handled in mechanized handling facilities.
- Around 180 numbers of 40 types of depot machinery, including bogie exchange machine, underfloor wheel re-profiling machines, testers and data readers, ultrasonic flaw detectors, trainset washing plants, among many other systems, will be used for the maintenance of trainsets as per Shinkansen standards at the depot.
- The depot will be fully energy-efficient. The sheds and buildings will be designed in such a way that solar panels can be installed in the future. Building Management System, IT and Data Network System, Fire Detection and Alarm System, Access Control System, etc. will be provided for a safe and conducive working environment for workers.

The depot will cover an area of 57 hectares of land near Anjurdive village in Bhiwandi. As the tender of the Package "C3" of the Mumbai-Ahmedabad high-speed rail corridor has been awarded to Larsen and Toubro, it will construct the tracks that will approach the depot from both north and south sides, and the depot will be designed and constructed by Dineshchandra R. Agrawal Infracon (DRA)–Delhi Metro Rail Corporation (DMRC) JV, as part of Package "D1" of the project. It will be completed in a deadline of around 5.5 years. Construction began from March 2024, after the land acquisition was fully completed, and is slated to be completed by the first half of 2028, along with the station.

== Connectivity ==
=== Road ===
An approach road to the station will be built to connect with the Badlapur-Kalyan Road.

=== Rail ===
The nearest railway station after the station's completion will be Datiwali railway station, located only about 300 m (980 ft) from the station. A skywalk will be built to connect that station with the concourse building. The nearest major railway station will be Diva Junction railway station, located around 2 km (1.2 mi) west of the station.

=== Metro ===
The nearest metro station after the station's completion will be Nilaje Gaon metro station of Line 14 (Magenta Line) and Line 12 (Orange Line) of Mumbai Metro on the Badlapur-Kalyan Road, passing between Palava City and Nilaje. Line 12 will directly connect the station with the under-construction Navi Mumbai International Airport. The metro lines are currently being executed, out of which Line 12 is under construction and is slated to be completed by the end of 2027, while Line 14 is planned to be completed by 2027.

=== Air ===
The station is located around 30 km (19 mi) north from the under-construction Navi Mumbai International Airport and around 40 km (25 mi) north-east from Chhatrapati Shivaji Maharaj International Airport.

== Environmental concerns ==
When the design for the station was being created by the National High Speed Rail Corporation Limited (NHSRCL) with Japanese engineers, they found the number of mangroves to be affected by the construction as over 53,000. This assessment was sent to the Ministry of Environment, Forest and Climate Change (MoEFCC) for obtaining Coastal Regulation Zone (CRZ) and Forest Clearances, necessary for starting the construction. However, the Ministry objected to the design and stated to them to change the design without changing the location of the proposed station, in order to reduce impact on the forests. The design was changed by them after a re-analysis, and this time found the number of mangroves to be affected reduced to about 32,000. The review was now granted by the Ministry. Only during construction on the 13-hectare land, the 32,000 mangroves will become affected, while after completion of the station, around 160,000 new mangroves will be planted. In this way, the environment as well as the green cover will be protected and increased.

== Future plans ==
The station will be expanded to handle more passenger capacity and trains by integrating it with the Mumbai-Nagpur high-speed rail corridor, from where the conversion of four tracks into six tracks will get branched towards Sabarmati and another towards Nagpur. The Mumbai-Nagpur high-speed corridor is slated to be completed by 2032.

== See also ==
- High-speed rail in India
- Mumbai-Ahmedabad high-speed rail corridor
- Mumbai-Nagpur high-speed rail corridor
- National High Speed Rail Corporation Limited
- Mumbai Metro
