= Boisar high-speed railway station =

Under-construction high-speed railway station in Maharashtra, India

General information
- Location: Warangade, Boisar, Maharashtra, India
- Coordinates: 19.7904°N 72.7930°E
- Elevation: 22 metres (72 ft)
- Operator: National High Speed Rail Corporation Limited
- Line: Mumbai–Ahmedabad high-speed rail corridor
- Platforms: 2
- Tracks: 5

Construction
- Structure type: Elevated
- Parking: Yes

Other information
- Status: Under construction

History
- Opening: 2029
Route map
Key
- Source
Location
- Location within Maharashtra Location within India
- Interactive map

Boisar high-speed railway station is an under-construction high-speed railway station on the Mumbai–Ahmedabad high-speed rail corridor. This station is located in Warangade, Boisar, Maharashtra, India. It is the fourth station of the Mumbai–Ahmedabad high-speed rail corridor, after Virar station and before Vapi station.

== Construction ==
The National High-Speed Rail Corporation Limited (NHSRCL) had invited tenders for Package "C3" of the Mumbai-Ahmedabad high-speed rail corridor (MAHSR) in November 2022, with a deadline of around 4.5 years. In June 2023, Larsen and Toubro won the tender. The NSHRCL signed a letter of agreement (LoA) with Larsen and Toubro for the design and construction of Thane depot, Thane, Virar and Boisar stations in July 2023. The land acquisition of around 70 hectares for the station in Warangade and for the high-speed railway viaduct in the region began in 2021, and was completed in March 2024, marking the completion of the land to be acquired for the entire Mumbai–Ahmedabad high-speed rail corridor. Hence, construction on the station began from the same month, and is expected to be completed by the first half of 2028, the time also slated for the completion of the Maharashtra section of the corridor.

== Lines ==
The station will be served by the Mumbai–Ahmedabad high-speed rail corridor, and will be the fourth station of the Mumbai–Ahmedabad high-speed rail corridor in Boisar.

== Structure ==
The station will have two platforms and five tracks for regular, rapid-high-speed services and one extra line for the maintenance depot towards south. It will have two levels–the platform and the concourse with service floor as the entrance level. The exterior design of the station building will be inspired by the Arabian Sea because of its close location to it and the fishing nets used by local fishermen. The station area will have 2 platforms of 425 m (1,394 ft) length for 16-coach E5 Series Shinkansen trains.

== Features ==
The station will have all modern and advanced facilities and amenities for customers and passengers, distinct from Indian Railway stations and similar to airports. Its design has been made to accommodate sufficient space for passenger movement and amenities at the concourse and platform areas. There will be ticketing and waiting areas, a business-class lounge, a nursery, restrooms, smoking rooms, information booths, retail centres and a public information and announcement system. Moreover, skylight provisions will be present on the roof and exterior sides for natural lighting and reduced energy usage. The station will be developed as a transport hub through integration with all basic modes of transportation for better, faster and hassle-free connectivity to and from the station, such as autos, buses and taxis. Such features will be available in all 12 stations of the Mumbai-Ahmedabad high-speed rail corridor.

== Connectivity ==
=== Road ===
An approach road to the station will be built to connect it with Boisar and the under-construction Delhi–Mumbai Expressway through Boisar Road.

=== Rail ===
The nearest railway station after the station's completion will be Boisar railway station, located 6 km (3.7 mi) west from the station.

=== Metro ===
A possible extension of Line 13 (Purple Line) of Mumbai Metro is being considered by the Mumbai Metropolitan Region Development Authority (MMRDA) to link Boisar with Mumbai, as part of the proposed expansion plan of Mumbai Metropolitan Region. If implemented, then Lines 13, 9, and 7 of Mumbai Metro will directly connect the station with Chhatrapati Shivaji Maharaj International Airport.

=== Air ===
The nearest airport after the station's completion will be Chhatrapati Shivaji Maharaj International Airport in Mumbai, located around 100 km (62 mi) south from the station.

== Land acquisition issues ==
When the National High Speed Rail Corporation Limited (NHSRCL) began acquiring land in the Boisar region, the Warli tribals living in the region began protests against NHSRCL and blocked surveyors from creating land surveys and soil testing required to start the construction, fearing that the project's implementation would lead to loss of their lands and residences. Such actions from people as well as from state government departments in Vasai-Virar, who challenged the development plan of the Mumbai Metropolitan Region that includes the high-speed railway project to pass through the region, had delayed land acquisition altogether in the entire Maharashtra section of the Mumbai-Ahmedabad high-speed rail corridor, that continued until 2022. Officials from the main funding agency of the Mumbai-Ahmedabad high-speed rail corridor project, the Japan International Cooperation Agency (JICA), met the tribals for negotiations, and hence, solved the problem.

== See also ==
- High-speed rail in India
- Mumbai-Ahmedabad high-speed rail corridor
- National High Speed Rail Corporation Limited
- Warli
- Mumbai Metro
