= Virar high-speed railway station =

Under-construction high-speed railway station in Maharashtra, India

General information
- Location: Sahakar Nagar, Virar East, Virar, Maharashtra, India
- Coordinates: 19.4362°N 72.8383°E
- Elevation: 62 metres (203 ft)
- Operator: National High Speed Rail Corporation Limited
- Line: Mumbai–Ahmedabad high-speed rail corridor
- Platforms: 2
- Tracks: 4

Construction
- Structure type: Elevated
- Parking: Yes

Other information
- Status: Under construction

History
- Opening: 2029
Route map
Key
- Source
Location
- Location within Maharashtra Location within India
- Interactive map

Virar high-speed railway station, shortened to Vasai-Virar station, is an under-construction high-speed railway station on the Mumbai–Ahmedabad high-speed rail corridor. This station is located near Sahakar Nagar, Virar East, Virar, Maharashtra, India. It is the third station of the Mumbai–Ahmedabad high-speed rail corridor, after Thane station and before Boisar station.

== Construction ==
The National High Speed Rail Corporation Limited (NHSRCL) had invited tenders for Package "C3" of the Mumbai-Ahmedabad high-speed rail corridor (MAHSR) in November 2022, with a deadline of around 4.5 years. In June 2023, Larsen and Toubro won the tender. The NSHRCL signed a letter of agreement (LoA) with Larsen and Toubro for the design and construction of Thane depot, Thane, Virar and Boisar stations in July 2023. The land acquisition of 71 hectares near Sahakar Nagar in Virar East and for the high-speed railway viaduct in the Vasai-Virar region began in 2019, and was completed in March 2024, marking the completion of the land to be acquired for the entire Mumbai–Ahmedabad high-speed rail corridor. Hence, construction on both the station and the depot began from the same month, and are expected to be completed by the first half of 2028, the time also slated for the completion of the Maharashtra section of the corridor.

== Lines ==
The station will be served by the Mumbai–Ahmedabad high-speed rail corridor, and will be the third station of the Mumbai–Ahmedabad high-speed rail corridor in Virar.

== Structure ==
The station will have two platforms and four tracks for regular and rapid-high-speed services. It will have three levels–the platform, concourse and service floor as the entrance level. The exterior design of the station building will be inspired by the sea breeze because of its close location to the Arabian Sea. The station area will have 2 platforms of 425 m (1,394 ft) length for 16-coach E5 Series Shinkansen trains.

== Features ==
The station will have all modern and advanced facilities and amenities for customers and passengers, distinct from Indian Railway stations and similar to airports. Its design has been made to accommodate sufficient space for passenger movement and amenities at the concourse and platform areas. There will be ticketing and waiting areas, a business-class lounge, a nursery, restrooms, smoking rooms, information booths, retail centres and a public information and announcement system. Moreover, skylight provisions will be present on the roof and exterior sides for natural lighting and reduced energy usage. The station will be developed as a transport hub through integration with all basic modes of transportation for better, faster and hassle-free connectivity to and from the station, such as autos, buses and taxis. Such features will be available in all 12 stations of the Mumbai-Ahmedabad high-speed rail corridor.

== Maintenance depot ==
The station will have one of the three planned maintenance depots, out of Vapi and Anand-Nadiad depots. Unlike conventional depots, these depots will be relatively smaller in size and will be used only for trainsets' maintenance and repairing related works. It will be located north of the station near Palghar. The depot will have all modern facilities similar to Shinkansen train depots in Japan, such as an elaborate rainwater harvesting system, waste and effluent management system, automatic cleaners, among many other advanced systems. All depots of the Mumbai-Ahmedabad high-speed rail corridor will have such features. Land acquisition for the depot was completed in March 2024, and construction began from the same month, with a deadline of completing it by the first half of 2028, along with the station.

== Connectivity ==
=== Road ===
The roads lying in vicinity to the station will be developed to link it with major city roads, as well as to the Golden Quadrilateral and the under-construction Delhi–Mumbai Expressway.

=== Rail ===
The nearest railway station after the station's completion will be Virar railway station, located 2 km (1.2 mi) west from the station. The station will also hold a significance for faster connectivity by rail, as it is the only fastest mode of transport between the cities of Mumbai and Virar at present, by reducing the commute time significantly. After completion, it will decrease the time from existing 2 hours to only 30 minutes.

=== Metro ===
The planned Line 13 (Purple Line) of Mumbai Metro from Mira Road to Virar East will have a metro station within 5 km (3.1 mi) distance north-east of the station, for which a new road will be built to provide connectivity. Lines 13, 9, and 7 of Mumbai Metro will directly connect the station with Chhatrapati Shivaji Maharaj International Airport after completion of both the lines themselves and the station.

=== Air ===
The nearest airport after the station's completion will be Chhatrapati Shivaji Maharaj International Airport in Mumbai, located around 60 km (37 mi) south from the station.

== Land acquisition issues ==
When the National High Speed Rail Corporation Limited (NHSRCL) began acquiring land in the Vasai-Virar region for the elevated high-speed railway viaduct and for the station, the civic body of the region warned to open a case to the Bombay High Court against NHSRCL in February 2019, after the Vasai-Virar Municipal Corporation challenged the development plan of the region created by the Government of India that included the high-speed railway project passing through Vasai-Virar in December 2018. The municipal corporation along with some political parties having their bases in the region stated that there was no need of considering the high-speed railway project to pass through the region, and instead of building it, they insisted the Government of Maharashtra to go ahead with the metro plan of Line 13 to provide direct connectivity to the Mumbai Metropolitan Region, which it urgently required owing to growing urbanization and population in the region. The corporators stated that around 3,000 farmers woulf lose their farming lands and 74 houses and shops would have to be razed in Vasai to build the project. Tribals living in Palghar district had started protests against the project in view of losing their lands, and so had blocked surveyors to create the land survey required to build the high-speed railway viaduct. Such actions from people as well as from state government departments had delayed land acquisition altogether in the entire Maharashtra section of the Mumbai-Ahmedabad high-speed rail corridor, that continued until 2022. To negotiate with everyone including the protesting tribals, officials from the main funding agency of the Mumbai-Ahmedabad high-speed rail corridor project, the Japan International Cooperation Agency (JICA), had reportedly met them and solved the issues.

== Environmental concerns ==
When the design for the station and the route for the elevated high-speed railway viaduct was being created by the National High Speed Rail Corporation Limited (NHSRCL) with Japanese engineers, they found the number of mangroves to be affected by the construction as around 54,000. This assessment was sent to the Ministry of Environment, Forest and Climate Change (MoEFCC) and the Bombay High Court for obtaining Coastal Regulation Zone (CRZ) and Forest Clearances, necessary for starting the construction. However, both the Ministry and the High Court objected to the design and stated to them to change the design without changing the location of the proposed station, in order to reduce impact on the forests. The design was changed by them after a re-analysis, and this time found the number of mangroves to be affected reduced to around 22,000. The review was now granted by the Ministry and the High Court as well. Only during construction, the 22,000 mangroves will become affected, while after completion of the station, around 260,000 new mangroves will be planted. In this way, the environment as well as the green cover will be protected and increased.

== See also ==
- High-speed rail in India
- Mumbai-Ahmedabad high-speed rail corridor
- National High Speed Rail Corporation Limited
- Bombay High Court
- Mumbai Metro
