= E5 and H5 Series Shinkansen =

Japanese high speed train type

E5 & H5 series
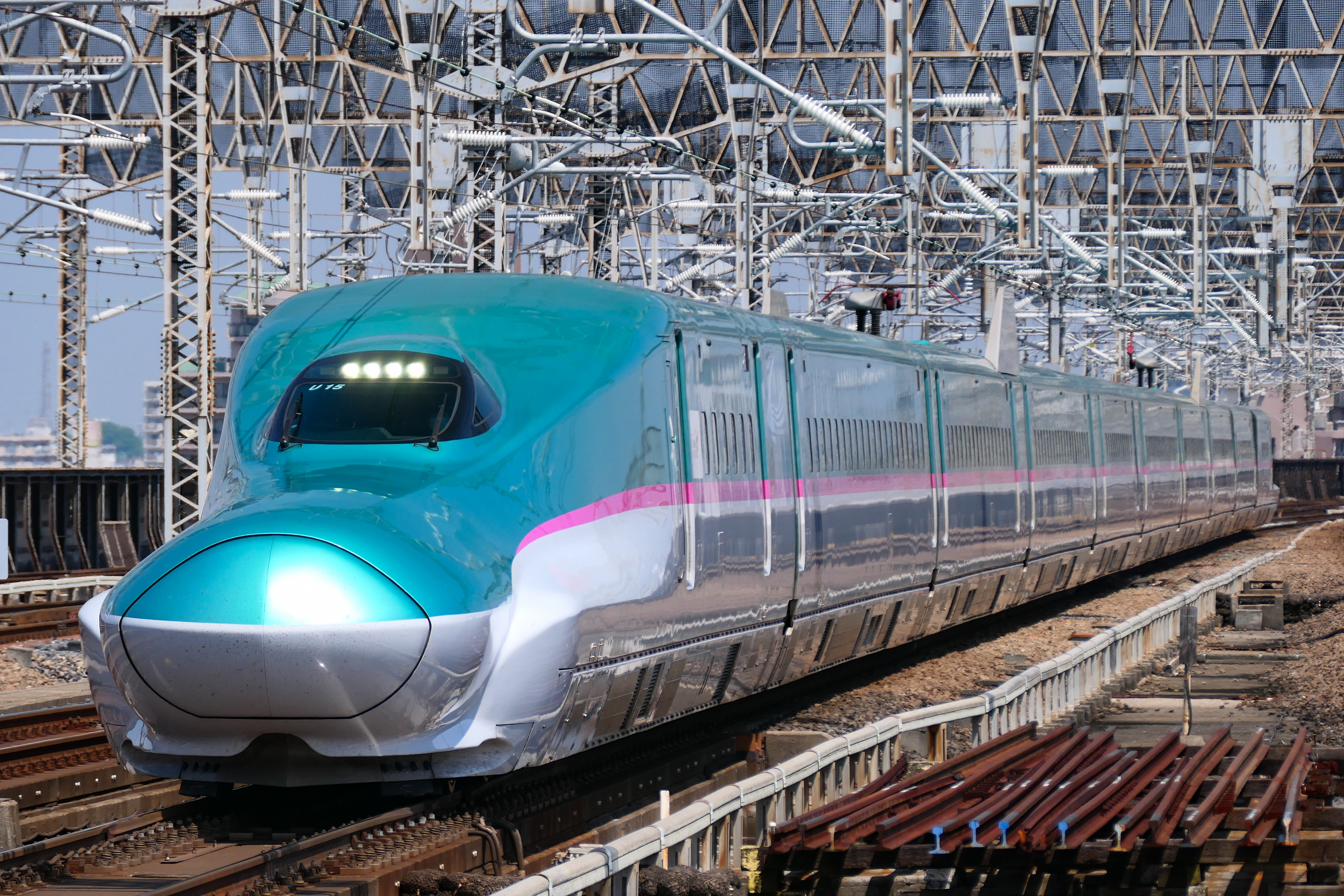
- E5 series set on a Yamabiko service, May 2022

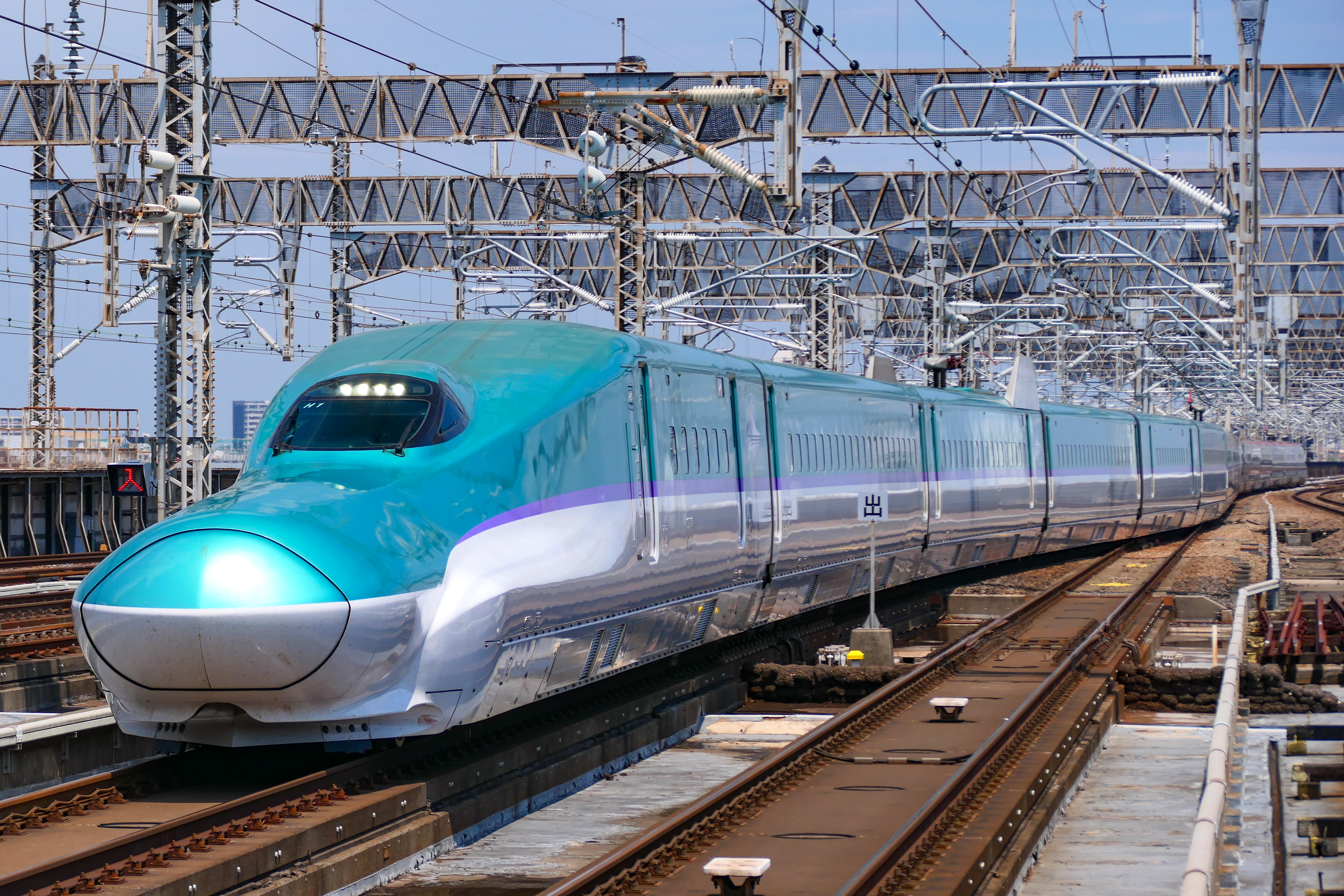
- H5 series set on a Hayabusa service, June 2022
- Stock type: Electric multiple unit
- In service: E5: 2011–present; H5: 2016–present
- Manufacturers: Hitachi; Kawasaki Heavy Industries
- Replaced: 200, E2 and E4 series
- Constructed: E5: 2009–present; H5: 2014–2015
- Entered service: E5: 5 March 2011; 15 years ago; H5: 26 March 2016; 10 years ago
- Number built: E5: 510 vehicles (51 sets); H5: 40 vehicles (4 sets)
- Number in service: E5: 510 vehicles (51 sets); H5: 30 vehicles (3 sets)
- Number preserved: 6 vehicles
- Number scrapped: H5: 4 vehicles
- Successor: E10 series (planned)
- Formation: 10 cars per trainset
- Fleet numbers: E5: U1–U59; H5: H1–H4
- Capacity: 731 (18 Gran Class + 55 Green + 658 ordinary)
- Operators: E5: JR East, National High Speed Rail Corporation Limited; H5: JR Hokkaido
- Depots: Sendai, Hokkaido (H5 only)
- Lines served: Tōhoku Shinkansen; Hokkaido Shinkansen; Mumbai–Ahmedabad high-speed rail corridor

Specifications
- Car body construction: Aluminium alloy
- Train length: 253 m (830 ft 1 in)
- Car length: End cars: 26.5 m (86 ft 11 in); Intermediate cars: 25 m (82 ft)
- Width: 3.35 m (11 ft 0 in)
- Height: 3.65 m (12 ft 0 in)
- Doors: 1 or 2 per side, per car
- Maximum speed: 320 km/h (200 mph)
- Weight: 453.5 t (1,000,000 lb)
- Traction system: 3-level IGBT-VVVF (Mitsubishi Electric, Toshiba or Hitachi)
- Traction motors: 32 × 300 kW (400 hp) MT207 AC
- Power output: 9,600 kW (12,900 hp)
- Acceleration: 1.71 km/(h⋅s) (1.06 mph/s)
- Electric system: Overhead line, 25 kV 50 Hz AC
- Current collection: Pantograph
- Bogies: Motored: DT209; Trailer: TR7008
- Braking systems: Electro-pneumatic, regenerative
- Safety system: DS-ATC
- Multiple working: Up to two units: E3, E6 or E8 series
- Track gauge: 1,435 mm (4 ft 8 1/2 in) standard gauge

Notes/references
- This train won the 55th Blue Ribbon Award in 2012.

The E5 series (Japanese: E5系) and the H5 series (H5系) are Shinkansen high-speed train types. A total of 63 ten-car trainsets are being built by Hitachi Rail and Kawasaki Railcar Manufacturing between 2009 and the present.

The E5 series is operated by the East Japan Railway Company (JR East) on Tōhoku Shinkansen services. A total of 59 sets were ordered, first placed into service on 5 March 2011.

The H5 series, a cold-weather derivative of the E5 series, is operated by the Hokkaido Railway Company (JR Hokkaido) on Hokkaido Shinkansen services. Four sets were ordered, with the first entering service on 26 March 2016.

== Design ==
Technology incorporated in the E5 and H5 series trains is derived from the experimental Fastech 360S train tested by JR East.

All cars are equipped with electric active suspension and can tilt up to 1.5°, allowing high speeds on curves with a radius of 4,000 m (13,000 ft).

The E5 series initially operated at a maximum speed of 300 kilometres per hour (186 mph), which was raised to 320 km/h (199 mph) between Utsunomiya and Morioka from the start of the revised timetable on 16 March 2013.

=== H5 ===
The H5 series is based directly on the E5 series, with an identical maximum operating speed of 320 km/h (199 mph), although speeds are limited to 260 km/h (162 mph) on the Hokkaido Shinkansen and to 160 km/h (99 mph) on the dual-gauge track through the undersea Seikan Tunnel connecting Hokkaido with Honshu.

The H5 series incorporates cold-weather adaptations, including upgraded snowplows on the lead cars, reinforced rubber connections between cars, and a stainless-steel undercarriage to protect electronic equipment, replacing the aluminum undercarriage used on the E5 series. Minor interior differences are also present compared with the E5 series.

== Operations ==
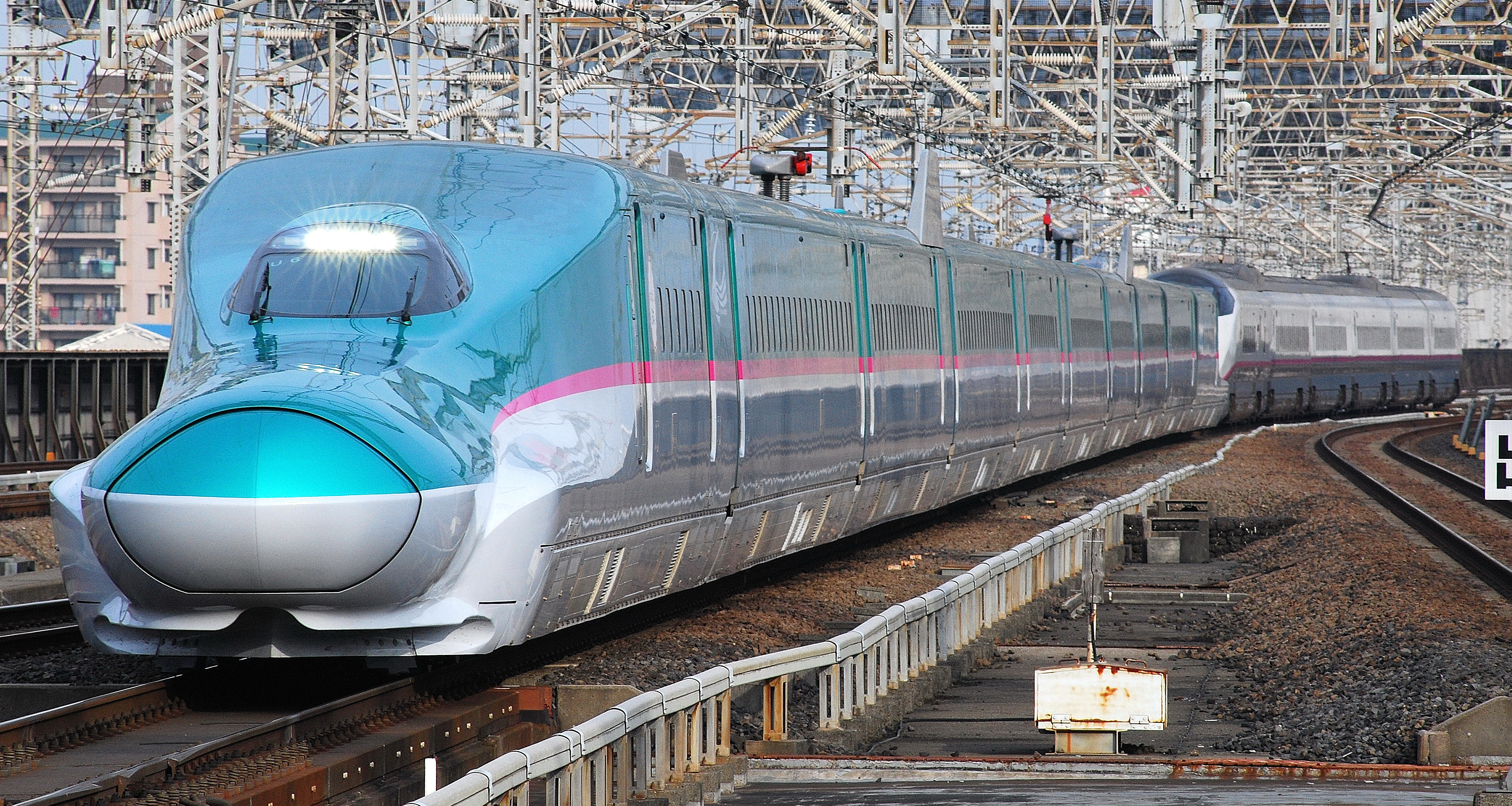
E5 series set U6 on a Hayate service, November 2011

As of 26 March 2016, the E5 series and H5 train sets work with each other, and are used on the following services on the Tōhoku and Hokkaido Shinkansen lines:

- Hayabusa
- Hayate
- Yamabiko
- Nasuno

E5 series sets were first introduced on the new Hayabusa services between Tokyo and Shin-Aomori from 5 March 2011, initially operating at a maximum speed of 300 km/h (186 mph). From 19 November 2011, a total of six E5 series sets were in operation, with sets also used on some Hayate and Yamabiko services. Hayate services operated coupled with E3 series Komachi services, and were limited to a maximum speed of 275 km/h (171 mph). From the start of the revised timetable on 17 March 2012, E5 series sets were also introduced used on some Nasuno all-stations services.

The H5 series is the first JR Hokkaido train type to use the "H" prefix, following the method used by JR East (with an "E" prefix).

== Exterior ==
The exterior design of both series is based on the experimental Fastech 360S train. The E5 series features a livery of "Tokiwa" green for the upper body and "Hiun" white for the lower body, separated by a "Hayate" pink stripe.

For the H5 series, the pink stripe is replaced by a "Saika" purple stripe, intended to evoke the lilac, lupin, and lavender flowers for which Hokkaido is known.

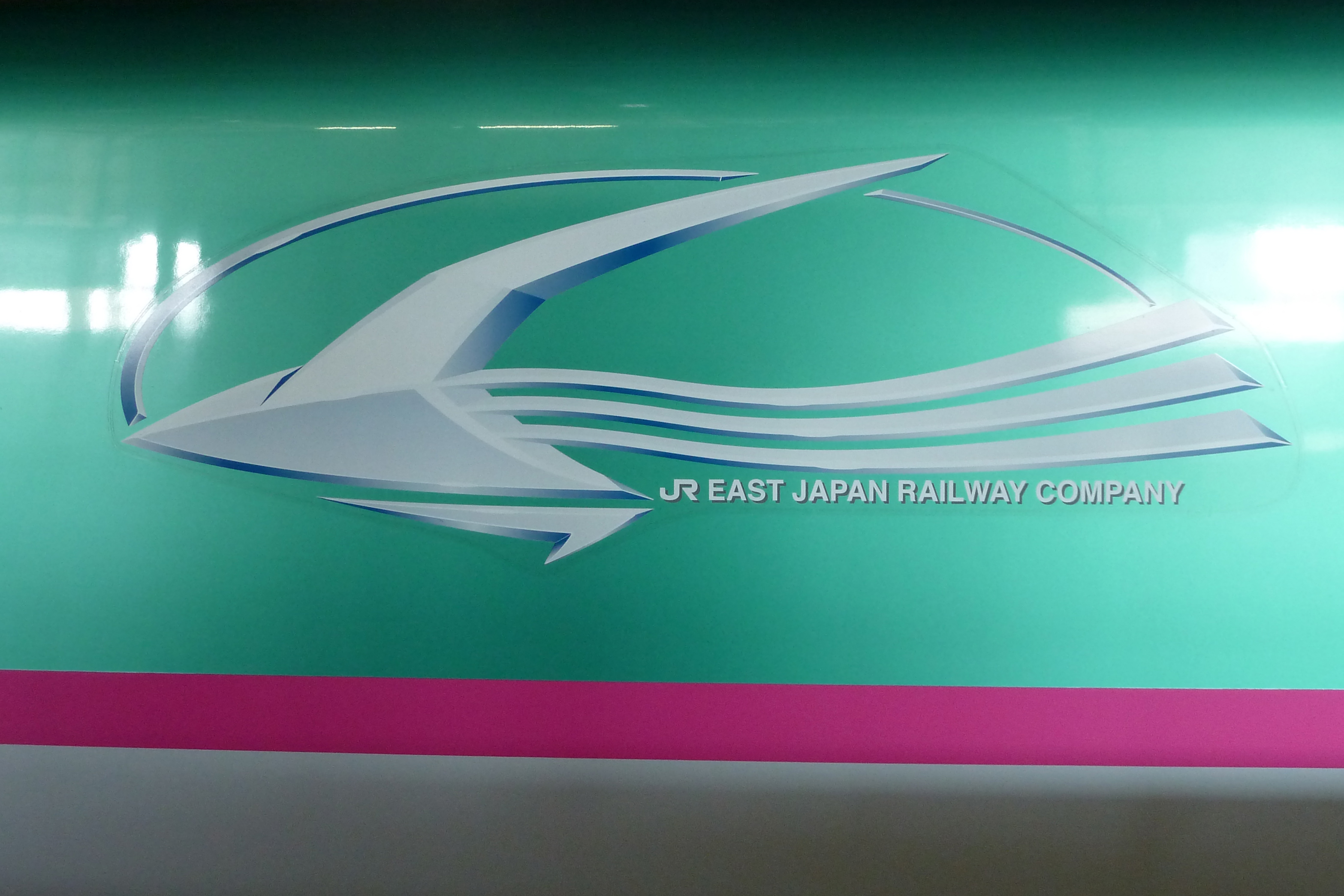
E5 logo, depicting a Hayabusa

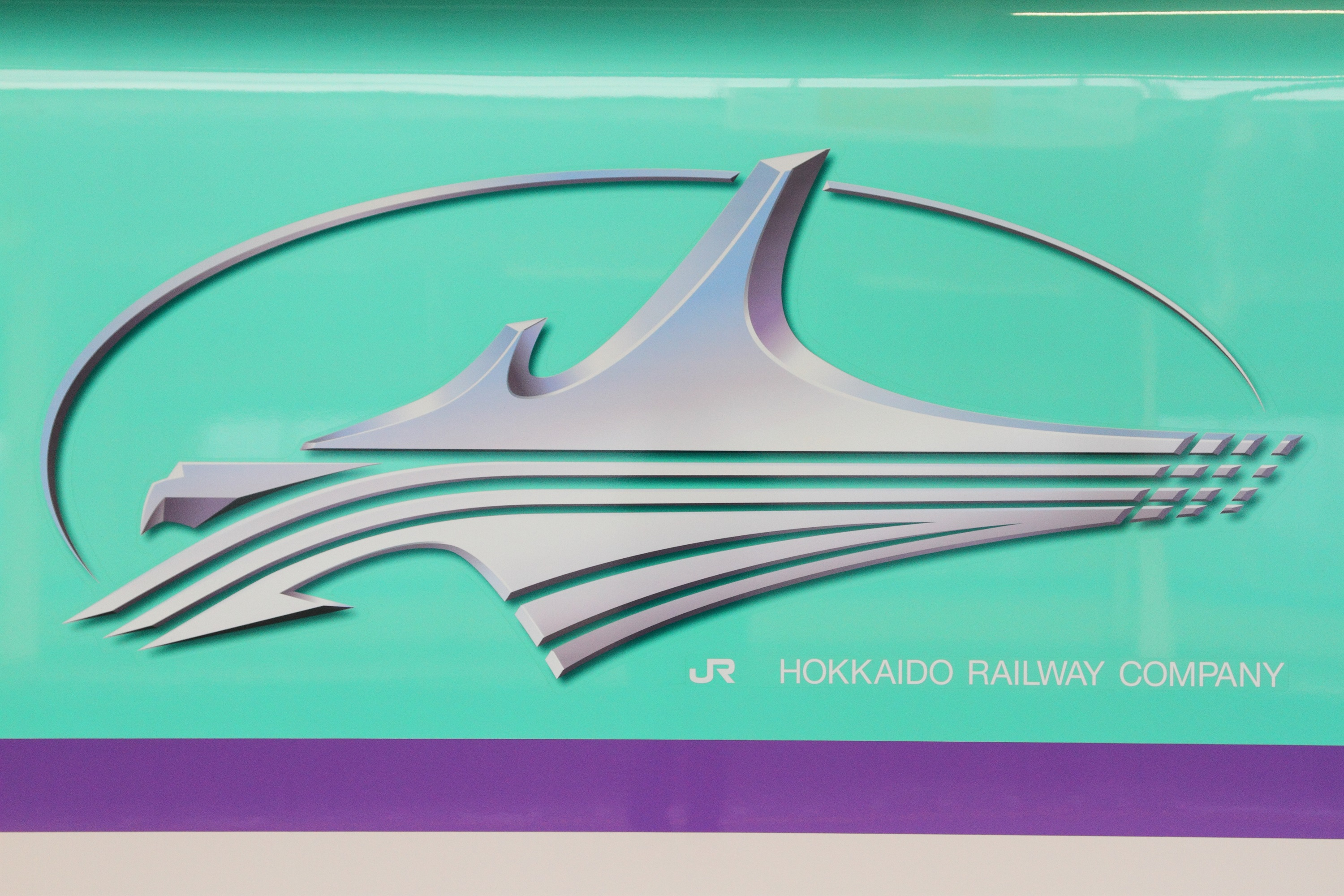
H5 logo, depicting Hokkaido and a Gyrfalcon

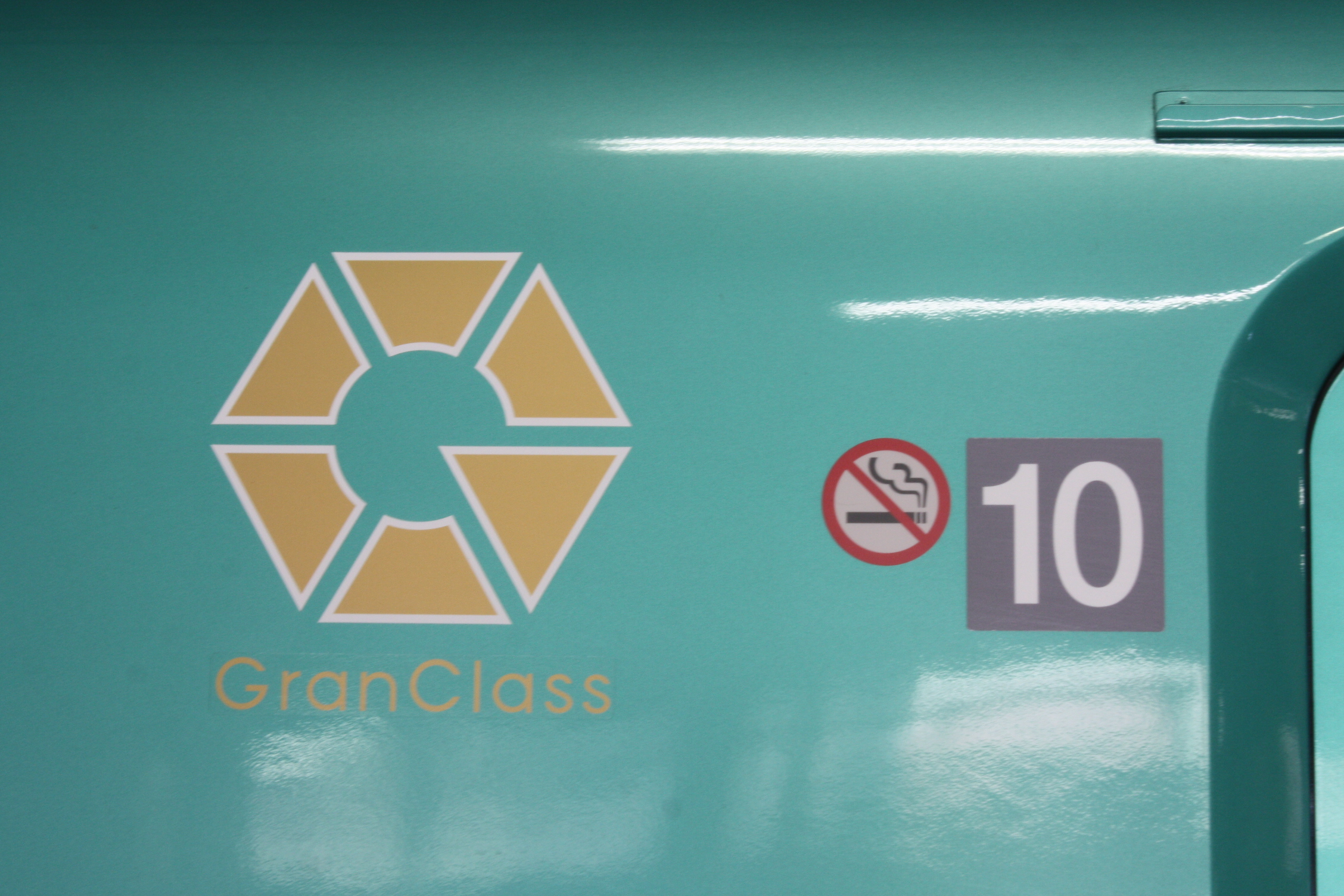
"Gran Class" car logo

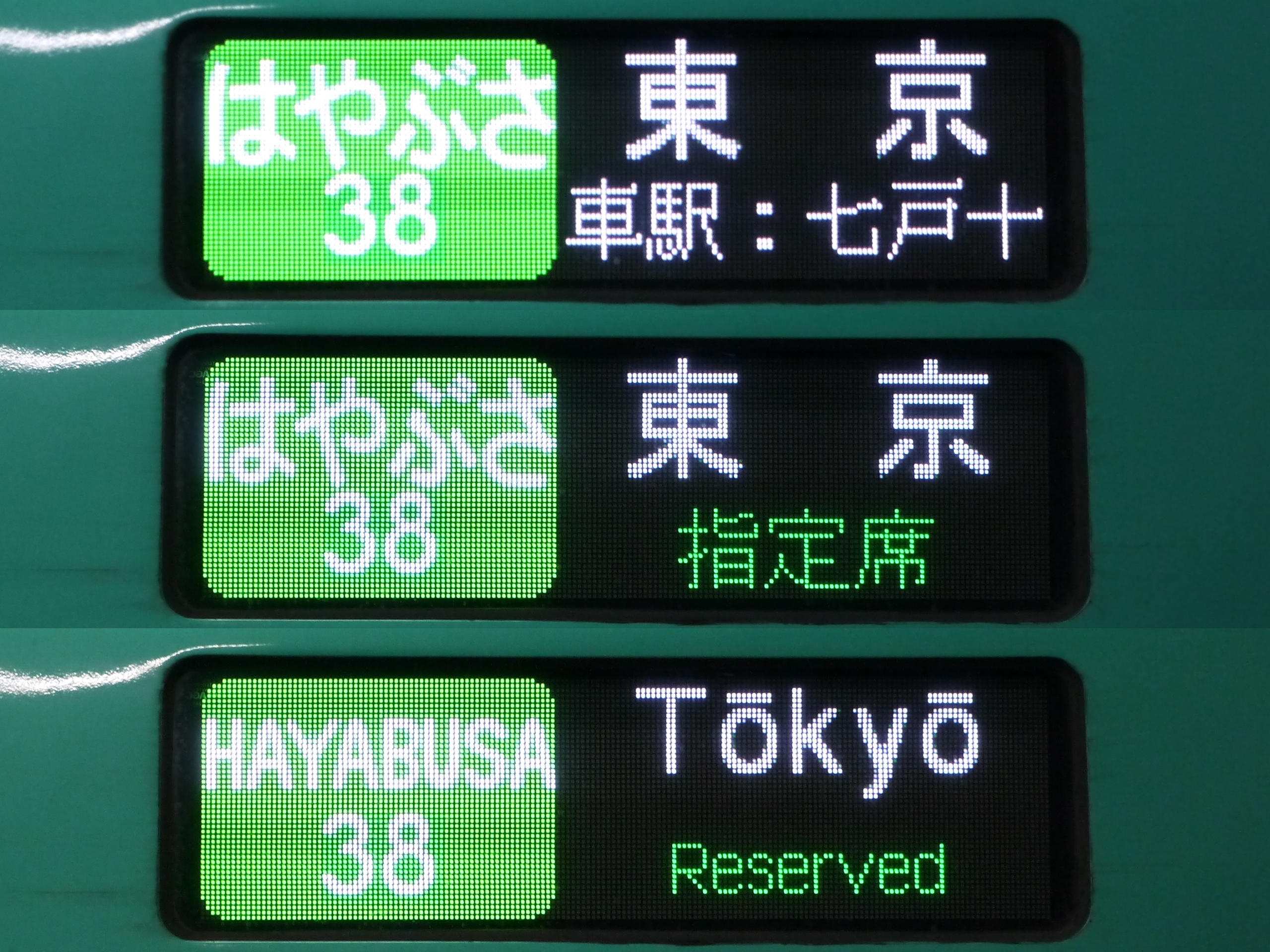
LED destination indicators

== Interior ==
The trains have three classes of accommodation: premium Gran Class (car 10), Green car (car 9), and Ordinary class (cars 1 to 8).

=== Gran Class ===
Car 10 is designated "Gran Class", featuring 18 power-reclining "shell" seats with leather seat covers arranged in 2+1 abreast configuration. Originally given the provisional name "Super Green Car", seat pitch in the Gran Class car is 1,300 mm (51.2 in). Seats are 520 mm (20.5 in) wide and recline to a maximum angle of 45 degrees. The pre-series set, S11, did not initially include Gran Class accommodation. The carpet in the H5 series's Gran Class car is blue with a pattern intended to evoke images of Hokkaido's sea and lakes. All seats in the H5 series feature AC power outlets.

=== Green car ===
Car 9 is designated as "Green car" (first class) accommodation with 55 seats arranged in 2+2 abreast configuration. Seat pitch is 1,160 mm (45.7 in). Seats are 475 mm (18.7 in) wide and recline to an angle of 31 degrees. The carpet in the H5 series's Green car is dark grey with a pattern depicting the ocean with fragments of drift ice. All seats in the H5 series feature AC power outlets.

=== Ordinary class ===
Ordinary-class cars (cars 1 to 8) have a seat pitch of 1,040 mm (40.9 in), which is 60 mm (2.4 in) larger than on the E2 series trains. Seating is arranged in 3+2 abreast configuration. AC power outlets are provided for window seats and rows of seats at car ends for the E5 series, and all seats for the H5 series. The interior of the H5 series's ordinary-class cars is intended to evoke images of snow and the night view of Hakodate.

=== Gallery ===
==== E5 ====
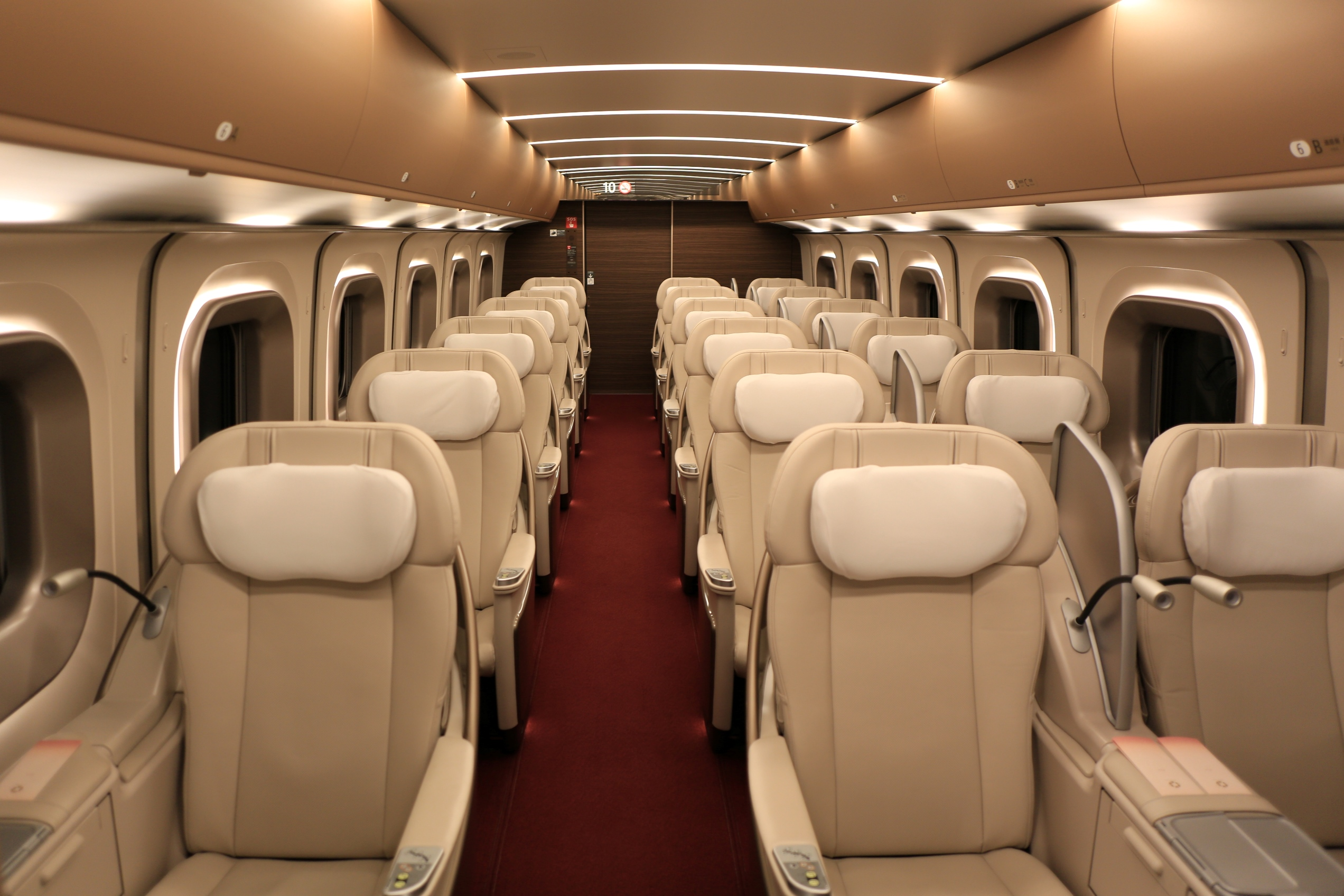
Interior of Gran Class car E514-21 in November 2014

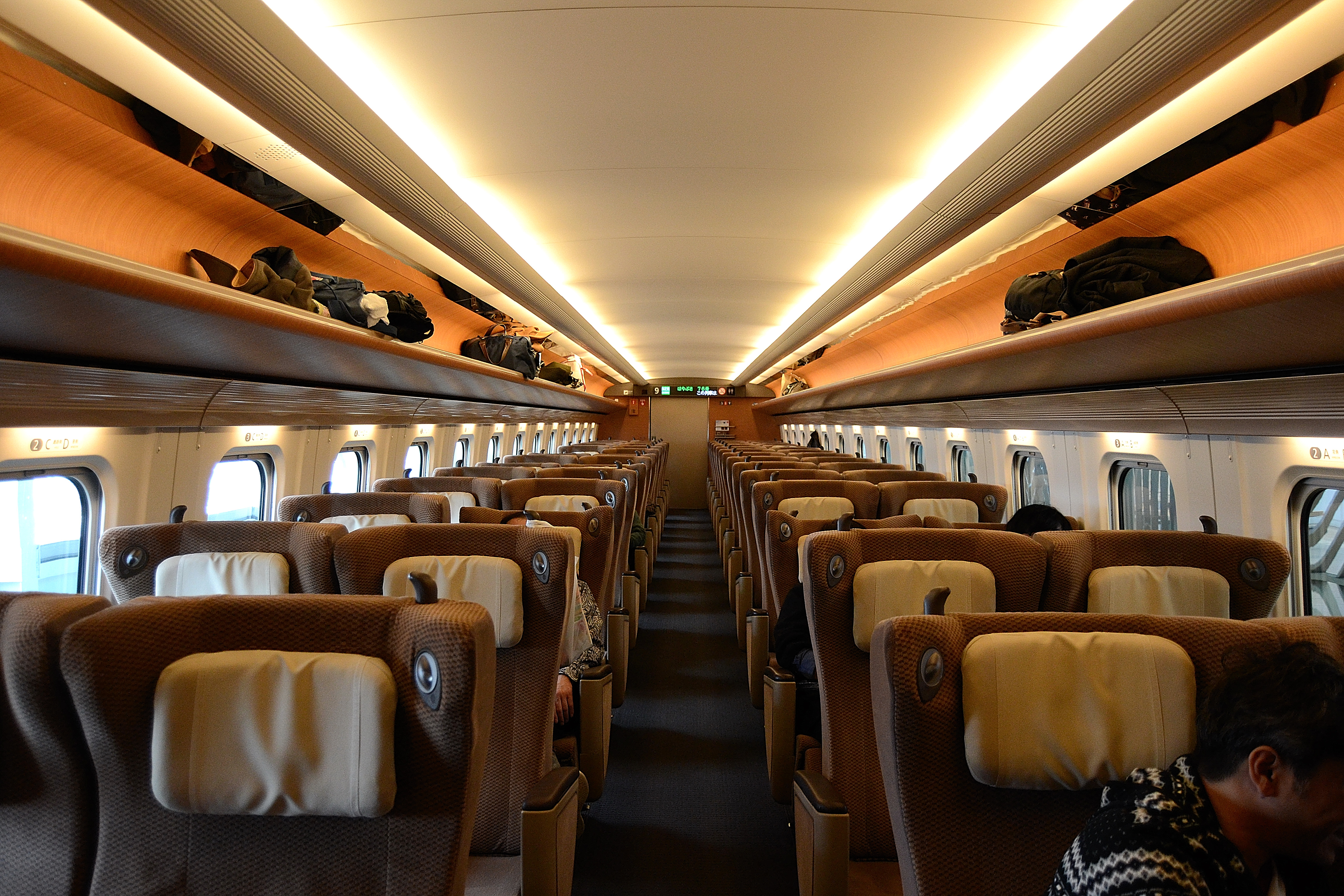
Interior of a Green car in March 2016

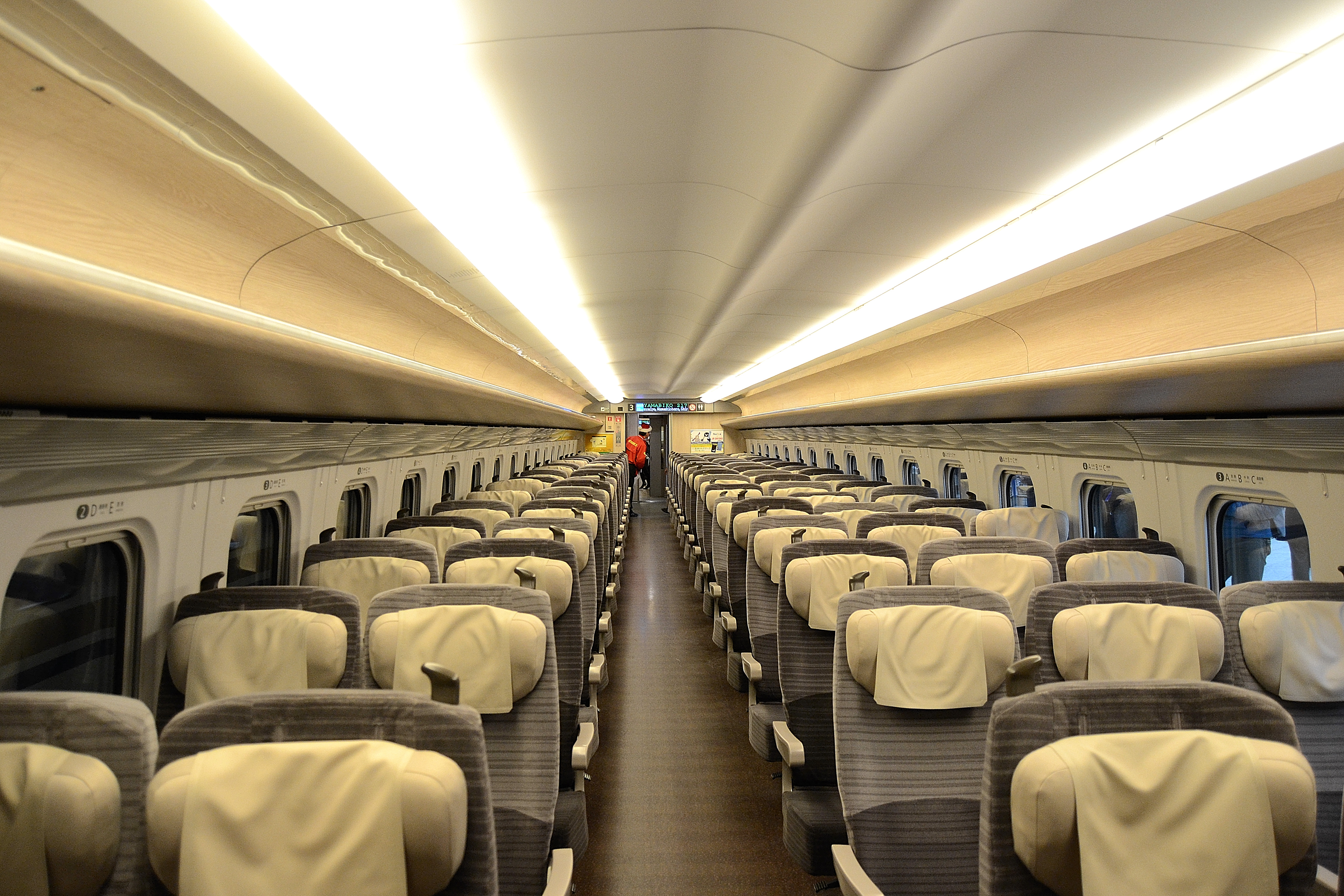
Interior of an ordinary-class car (car 3) in December 2015

==== H5 ====
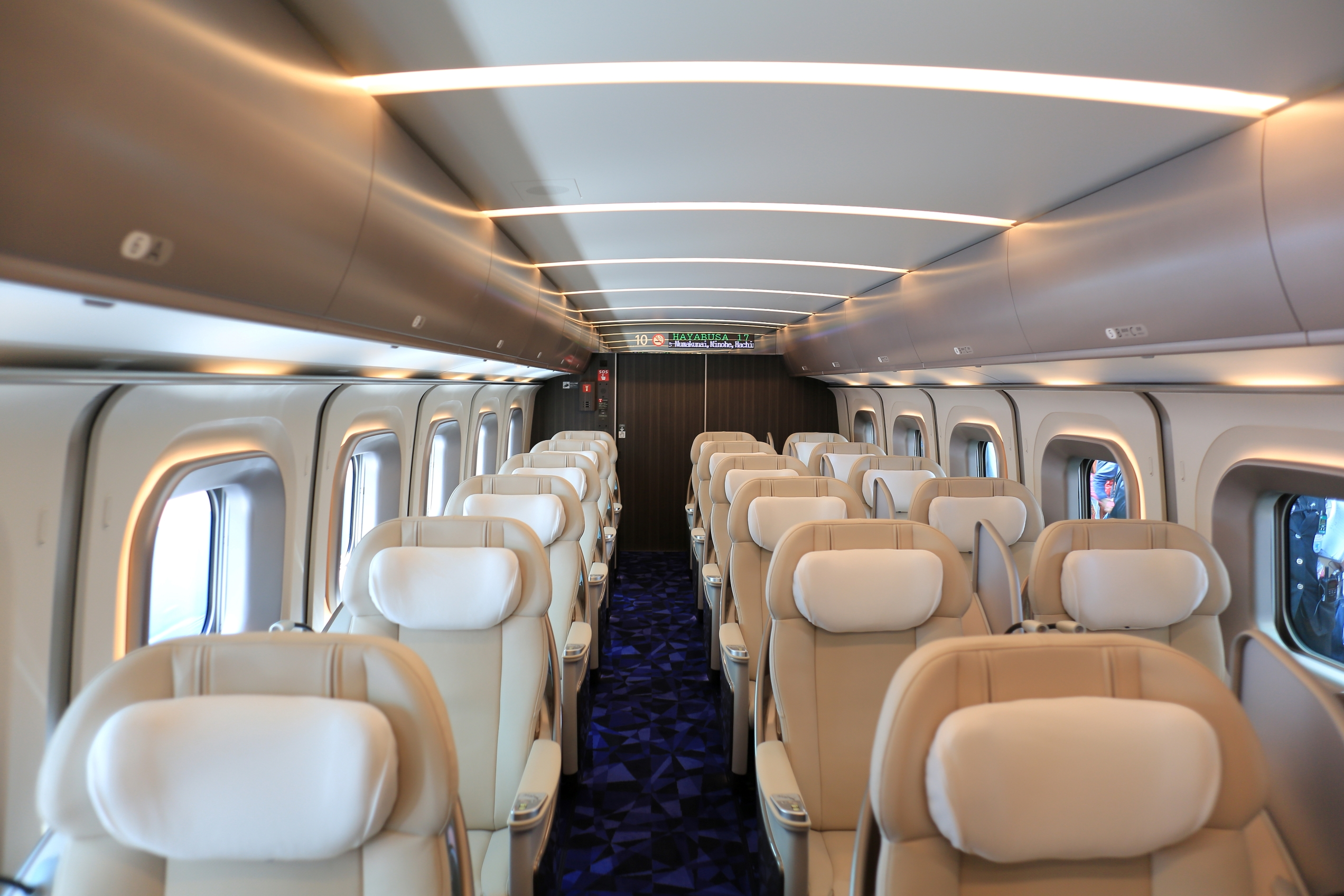
The interior of Gran Class car H514-3 in March 2016

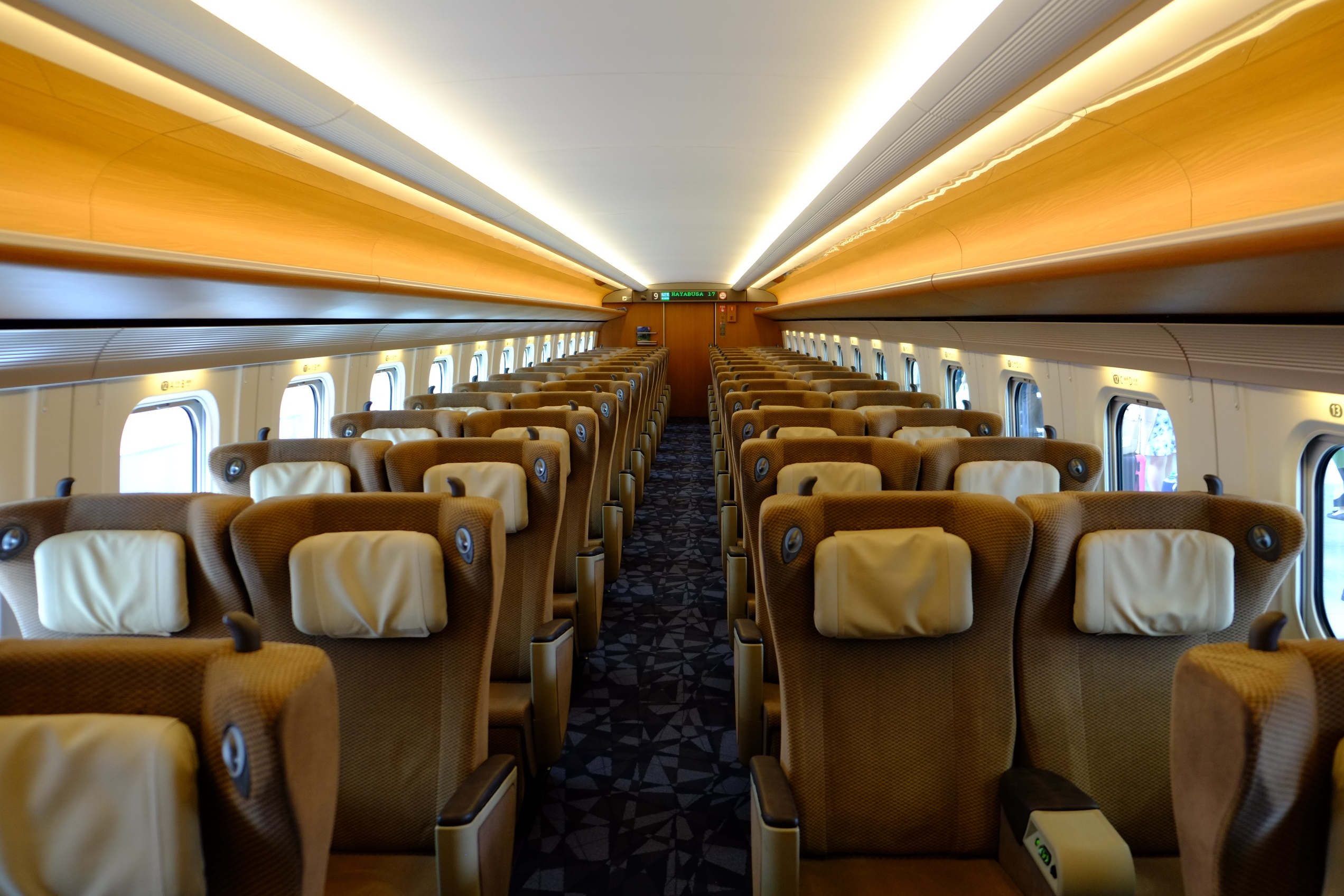
The interior of Green car H515-3 in April 2016

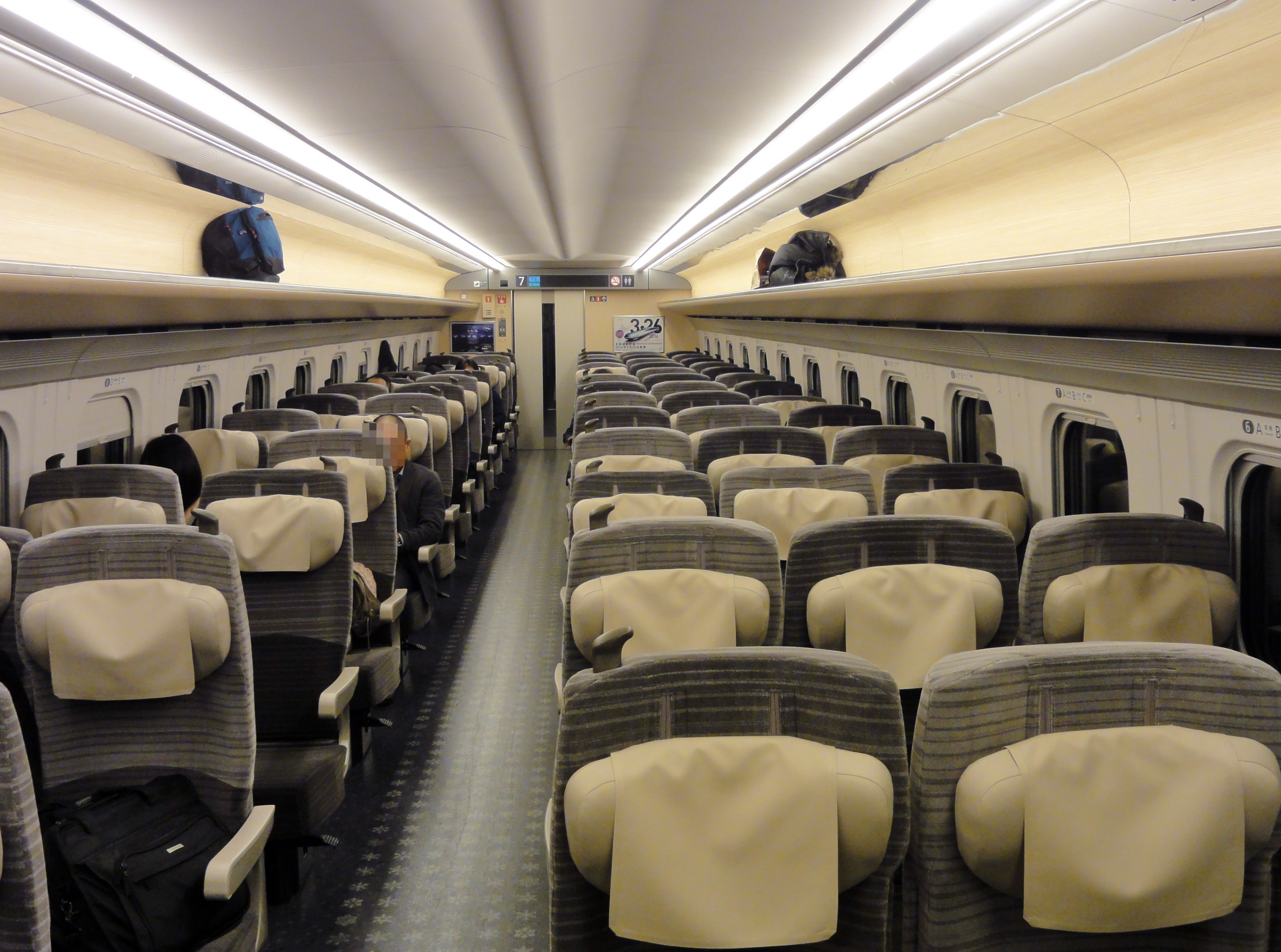
The interior of ordinary-class car No. 7 in April 2016

== Formation ==
=== E5 ===
The production E5 series sets are formed as follows, with car 1 at the Tokyo end and car 10 at the Aomori end.

Car No.	1	2	3	4	5	6	7	8	9	10
Designation	T1c	M2	M1	M2	M1k	M2	M1	M2	M1s	Tsc
Class	Ordinary								Green	Gran
Numbering	E523	E526-100	E525	E526-200	E525-400	E526-300	E525-100	E526-400	E515	E514
Weight (t)	41.9	45.9	46.0	46.3	46.1	46.8	46.8	46.0	45.8	42.7
Capacity	29	100	85	100	59	100	85	100	55	18
Doors (per side)	2 (+ cab)	2	2	2	2	2	2	2	1	1 (+ cab)
Facilities	Toilet		Toilet		Toilet, wheelchair space		Toilet		Toilet, wheelchair space, conductor's office	

Cars 3 and 7 each have one single-arm pantograph, although only one is normally raised in service.

=== H5 ===
The 10-car sets, numbered "H1" onward, are formed with eight motored ("M") cars and two non-powered trailer ("T") cars. Car 1 is at the southern end. Cars 3 and 7 each have one N-PS208 single-arm pantograph.

Car No.	1	2	3	4	5	6	7	8	9	10
Designation	T1c	M2	M1	M2	M1k	M2	M1	M2	M1s	Tsc
Class	Ordinary								Green	Gran
Numbering	H523	H526-100	H525	H526-200	H525-400	H526-300	H525-100	H526-400	H515	H514
Capacity	29	98	85	98	59	98	85	98	55	18
Doors (per side)	2 (+ cab)	2	2	2	2	2	2	2	1	1 (+ cab)
Facilities	Toilet		Toilet		Toilet, wheelchair space		Toilet		Toilet, wheelchair space, conductor's office	

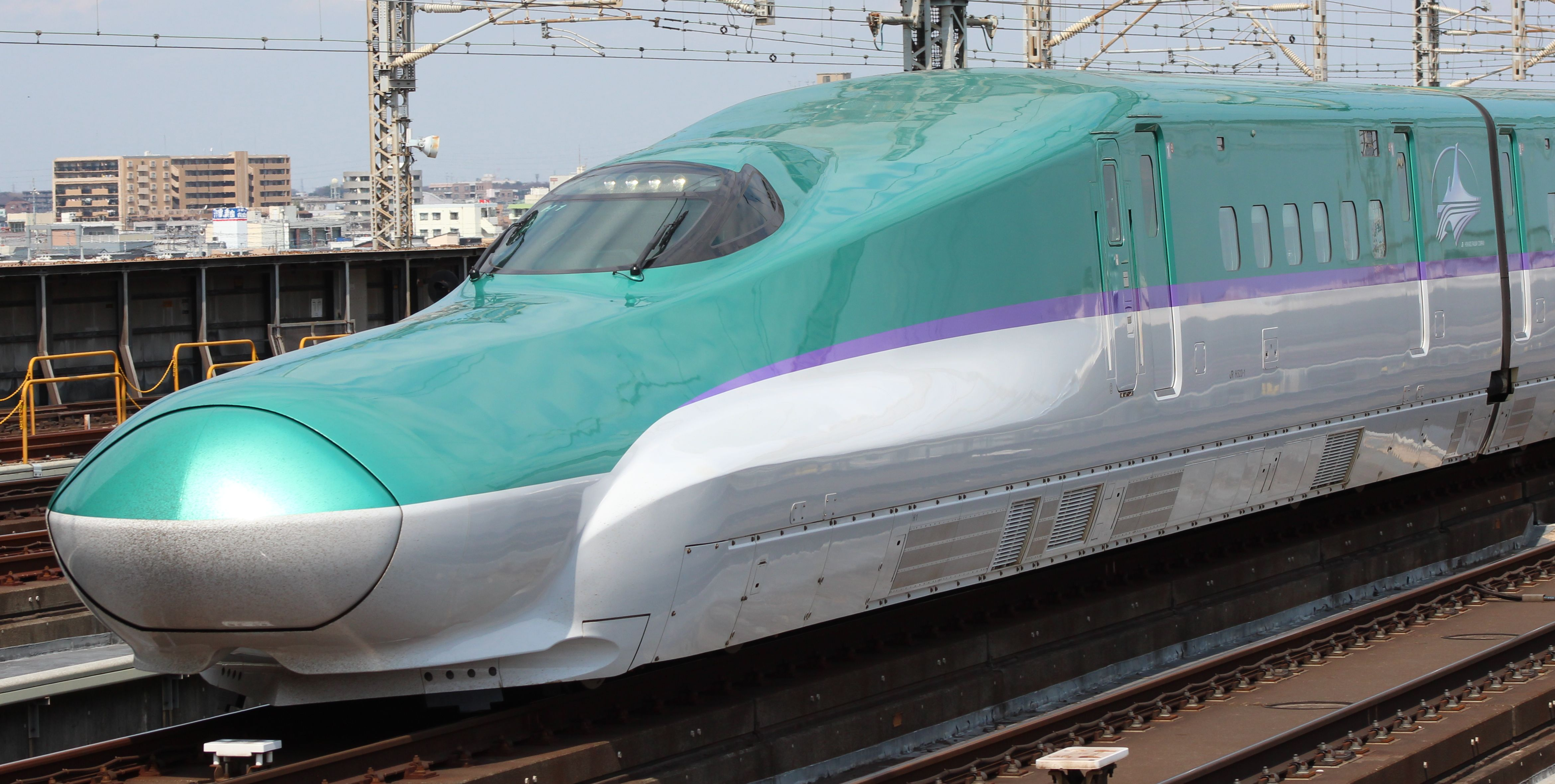
H523-1 (car No. 1) in March 2016

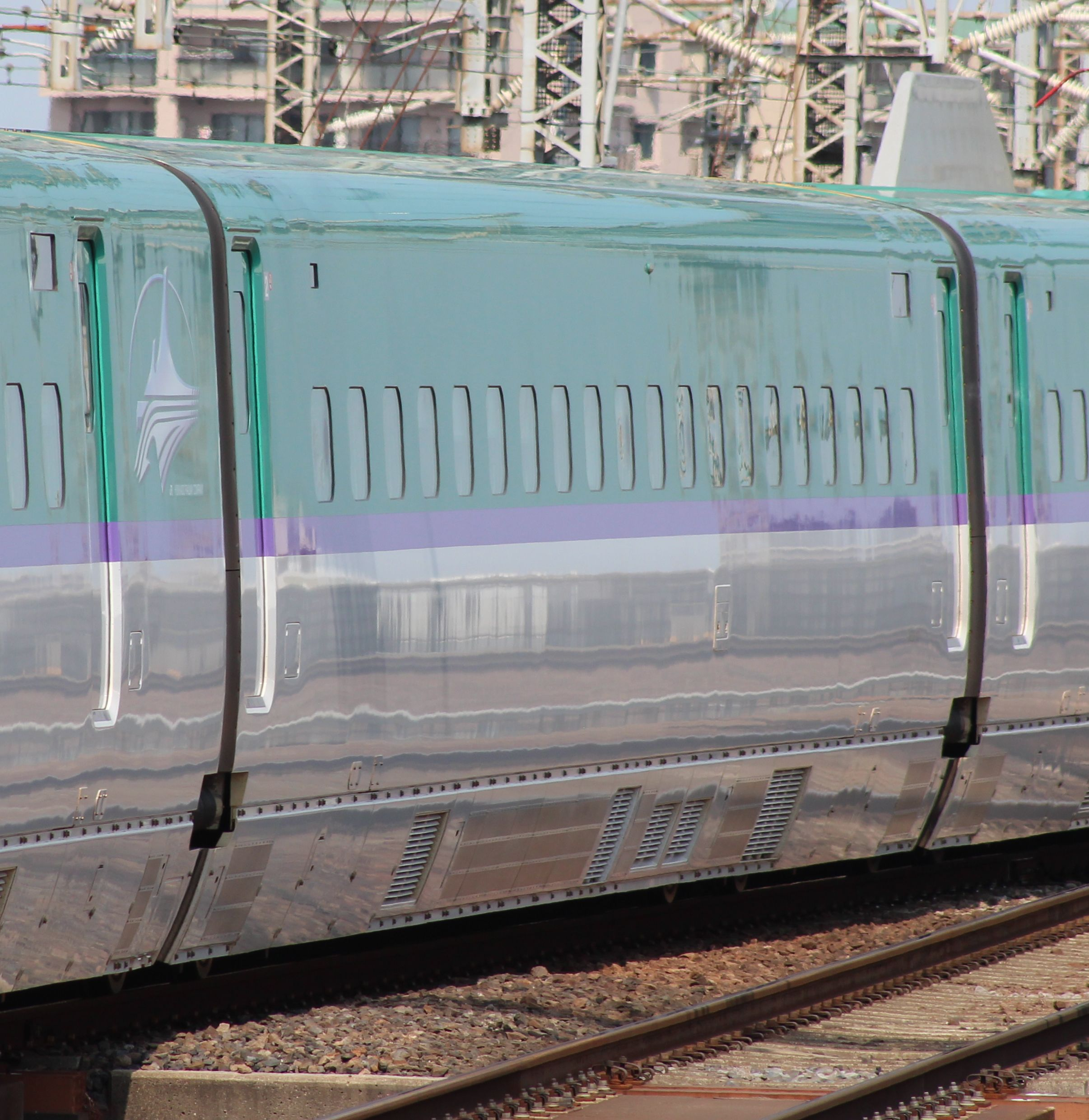
H526-101 (car No. 2) in March 2016

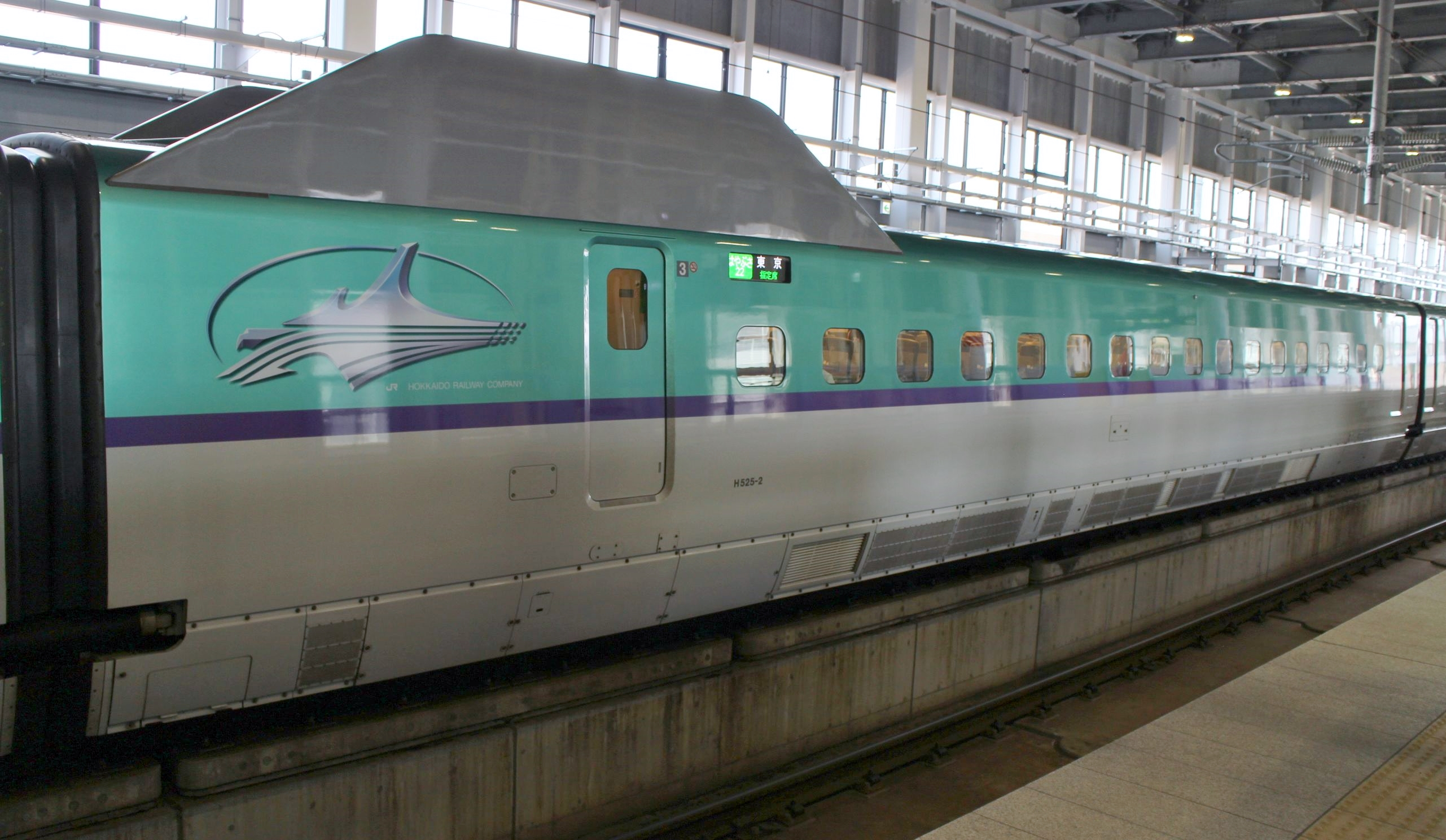
H525-2 (car No. 3) in April 2016

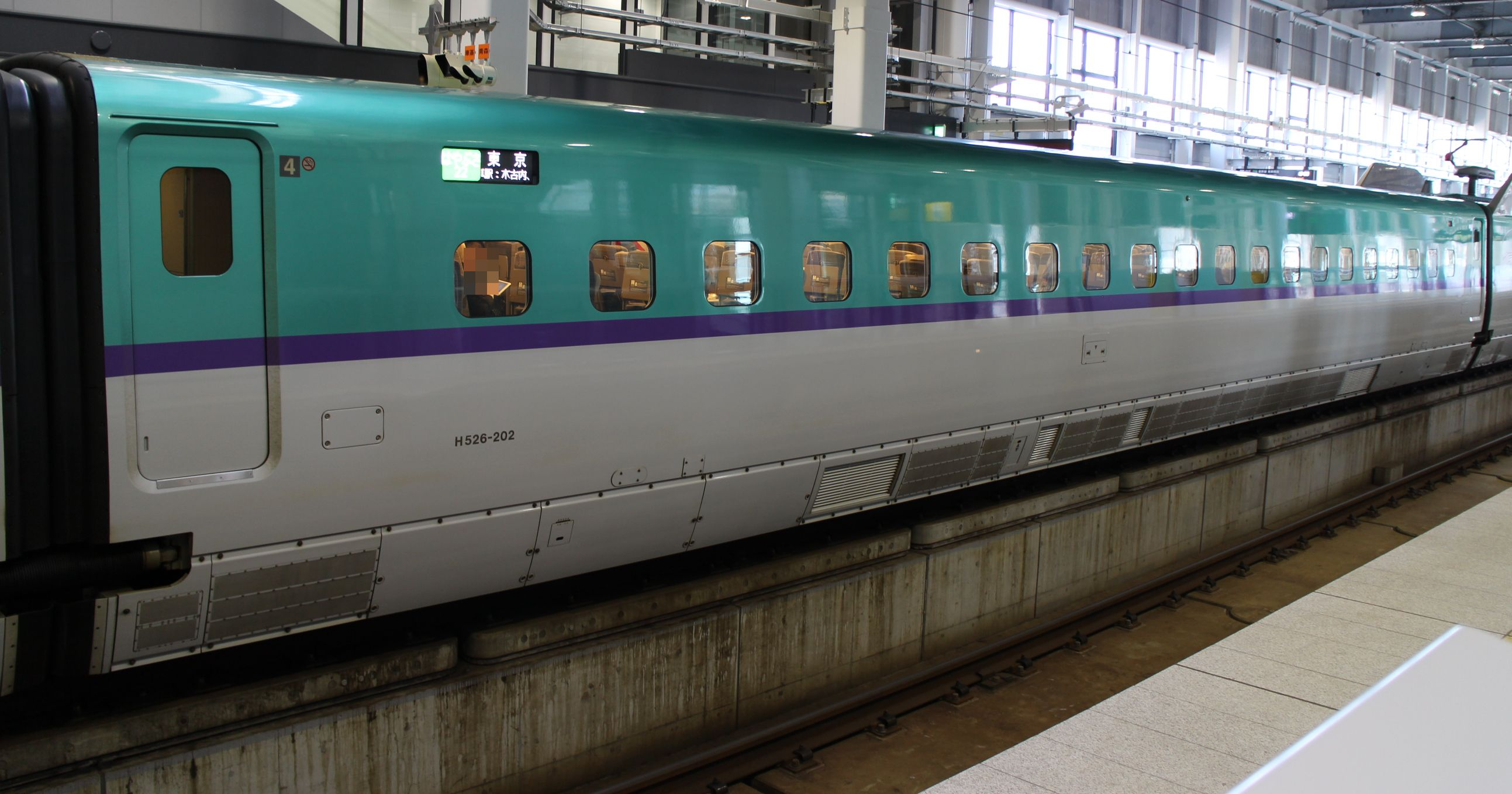
H526-202 (car No. 4) in April 2016

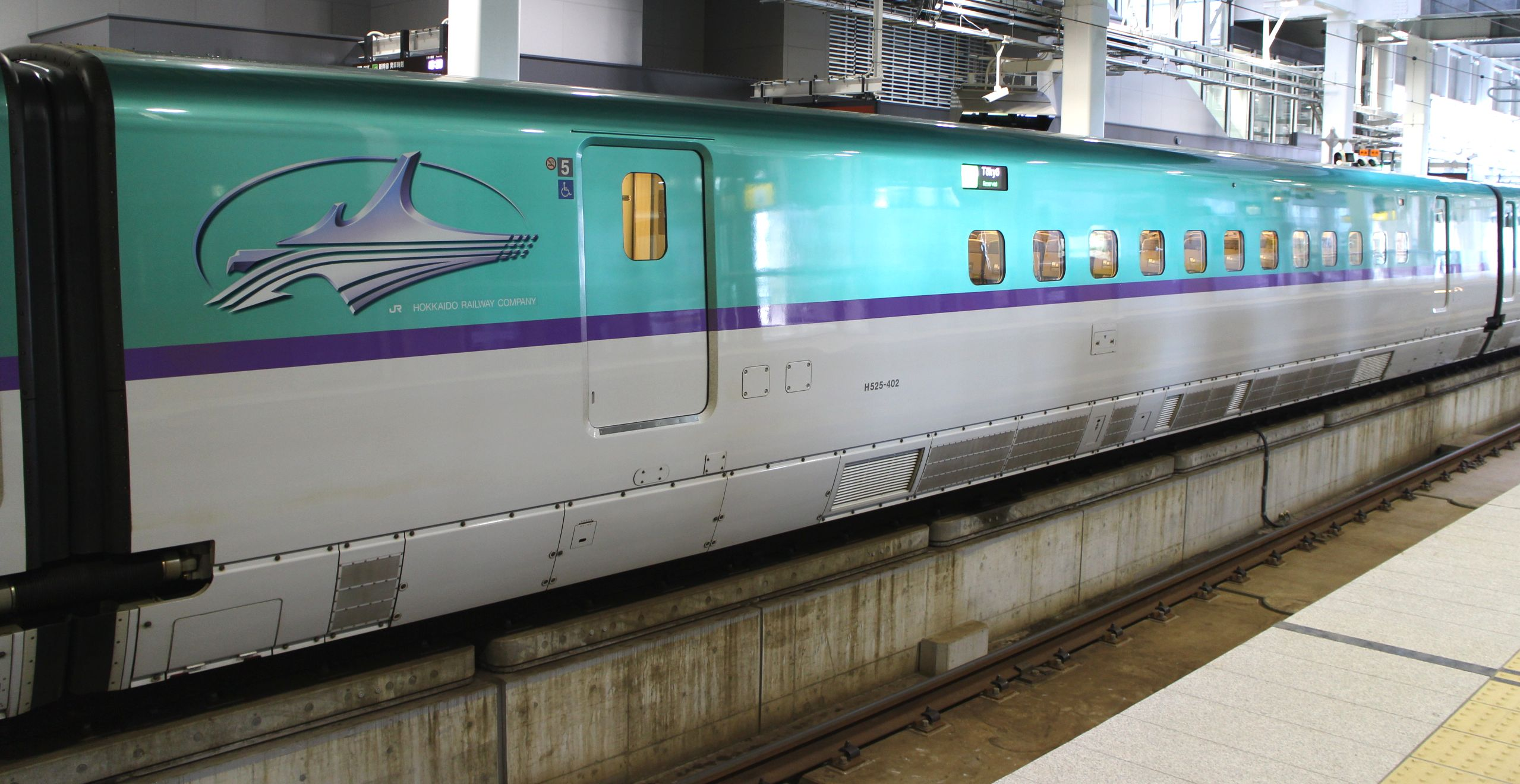
H525-402 (car No. 5) in April 2016

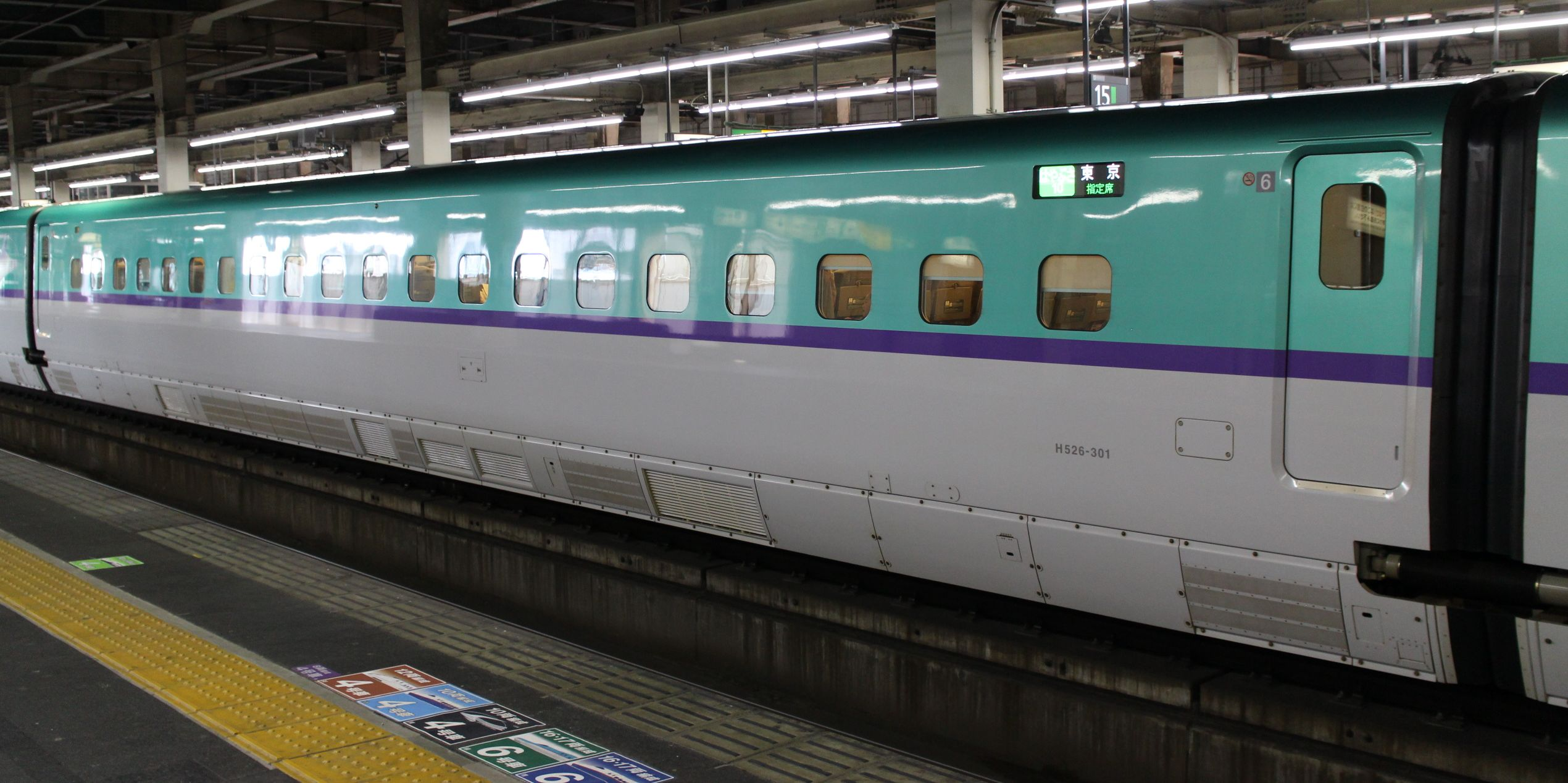
H526-301 (car No. 6) in March 2016

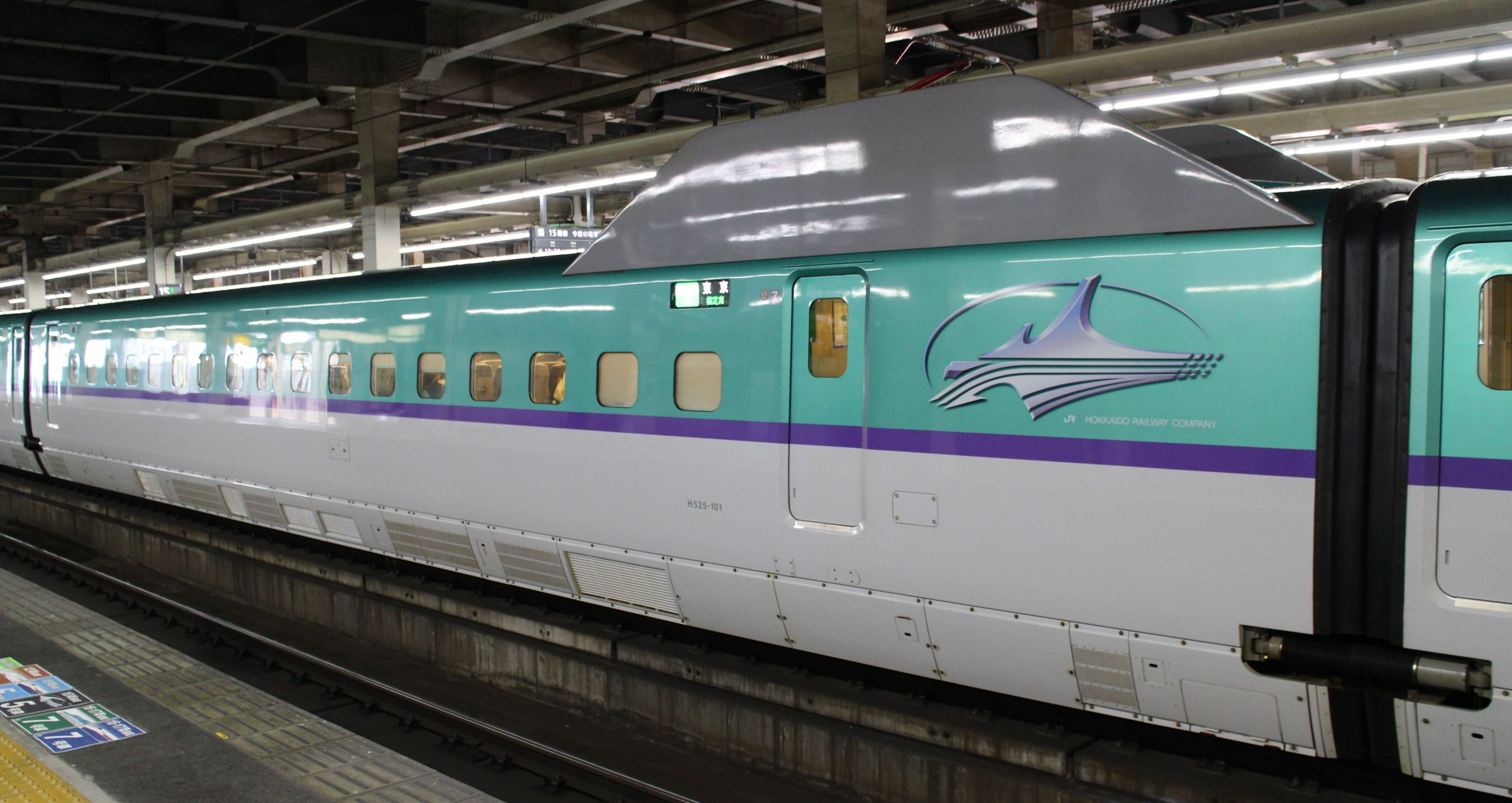
H525-101 (car No. 7) in March 2016

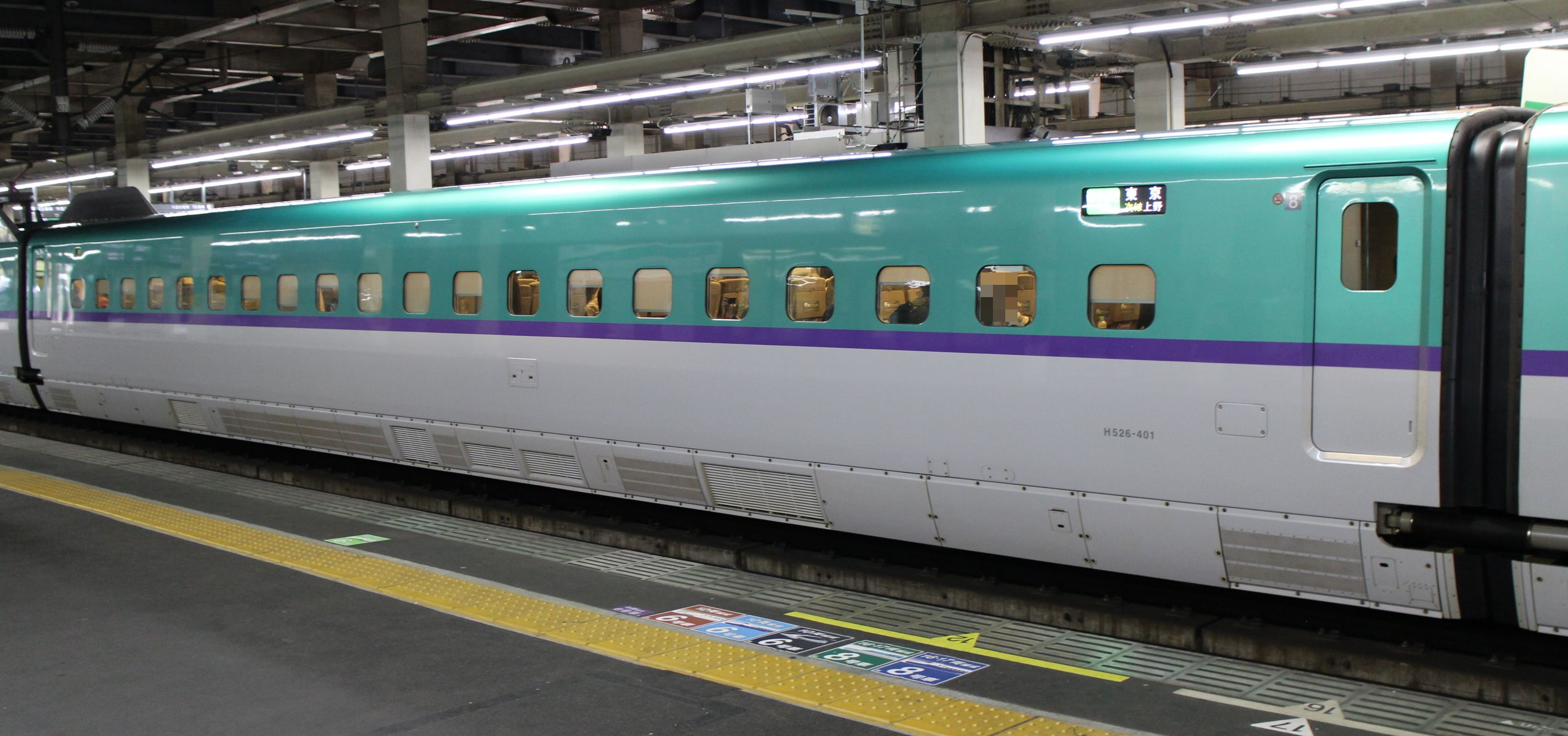
H526-401 (car No. 8) in March 2016

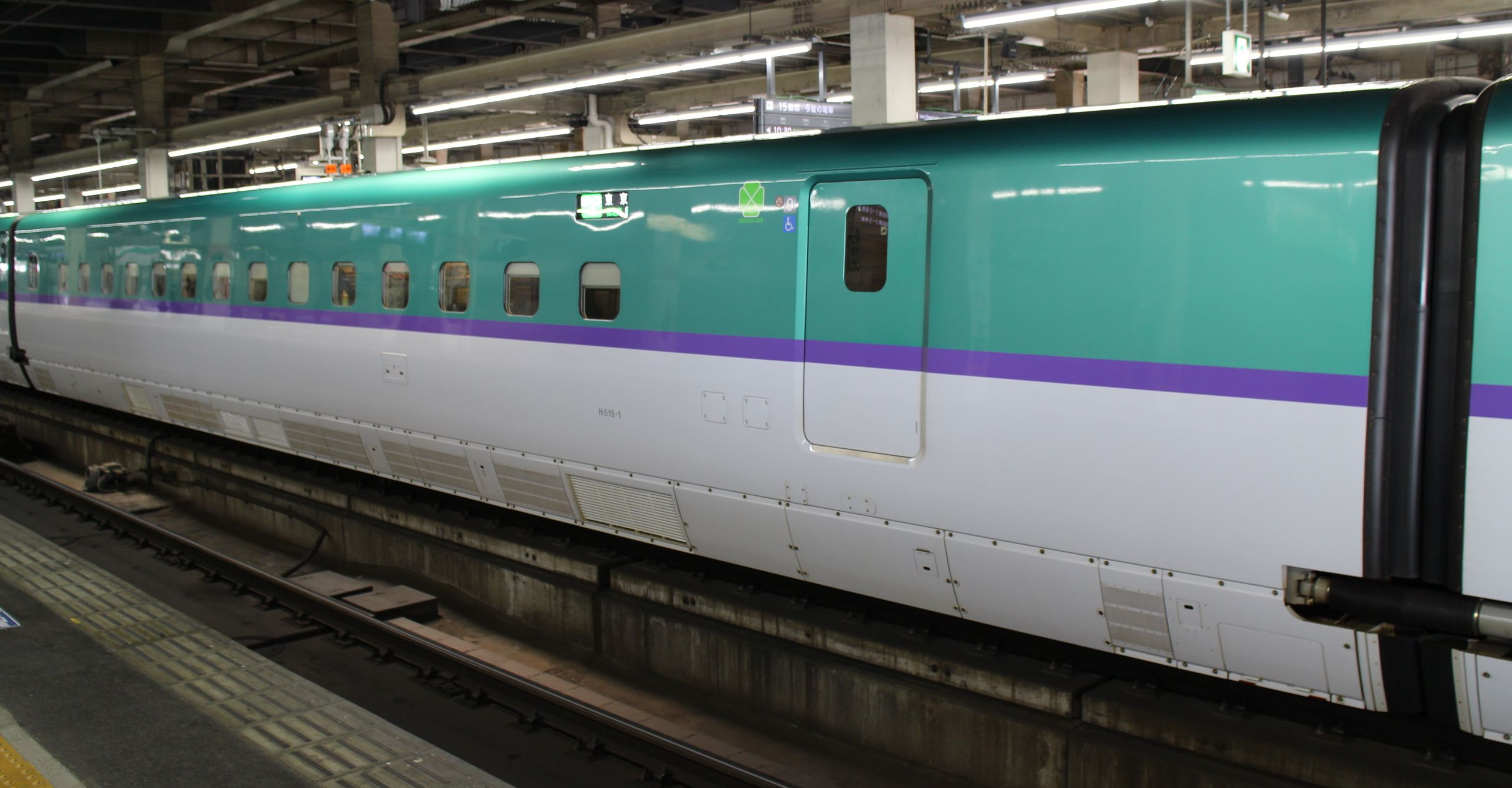
H515-1 (car No. 9) in March 2016

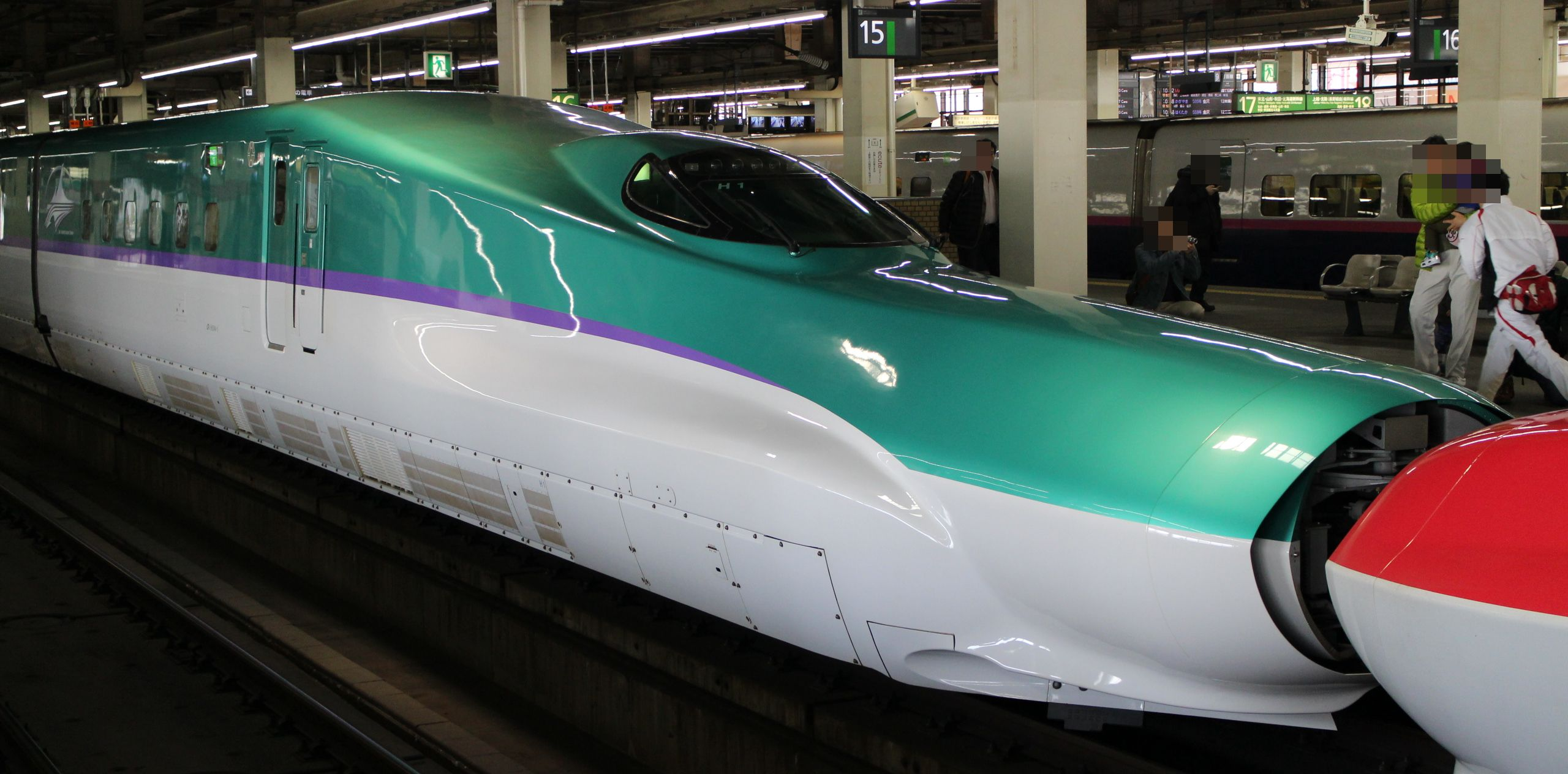
H514-1 (car No. 10) in March 2016

== History ==
=== E5 series ===
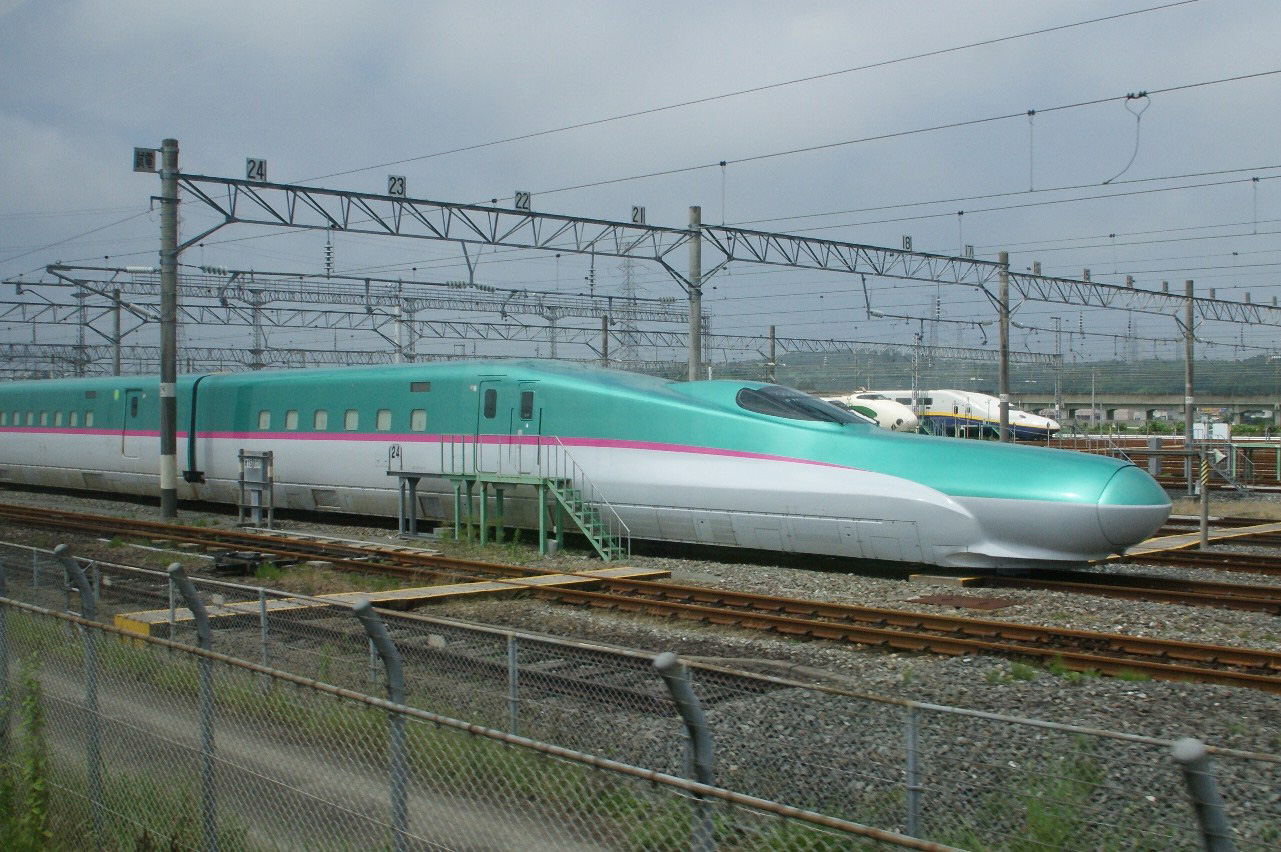
Pre-production set S11 at Sendai General Depot, July 2009

The pre-series set, S11, was delivered to Sendai Depot in May 2009 ahead of extensive test running on the Tōhoku Shinkansen. Cars 1 to 5 were built by Hitachi in Yamaguchi Prefecture, and cars 6 to 10 were built by Kawasaki Heavy Industries in Hyogo Prefecture. Set S11 made its first appearance at Tokyo Station on 9 December 2009.

The first full-production set, U2, was delivered to Sendai Depot in December 2010.

In May 2012, the E5 series was awarded the 2012 Blue Ribbon Award, presented annually by the Japan Railfan Club. A formal presentation ceremony was held at Tokyo Station on 20 November 2012.

The pre-series set, S11, was upgraded to full-production standard in February 2013 and renumbered U1. It retains the flush plug doors for the passenger doors immediately behind the driving cabs, whereas the full-production sets have recessed sliding doors.

From the start of the revised timetable on 16 March 2013, the maximum speed in service was raised from 300 km/h (186 mph) to 320 km/h (199 mph) between Utsunomiya and Morioka.

=== H5 series ===
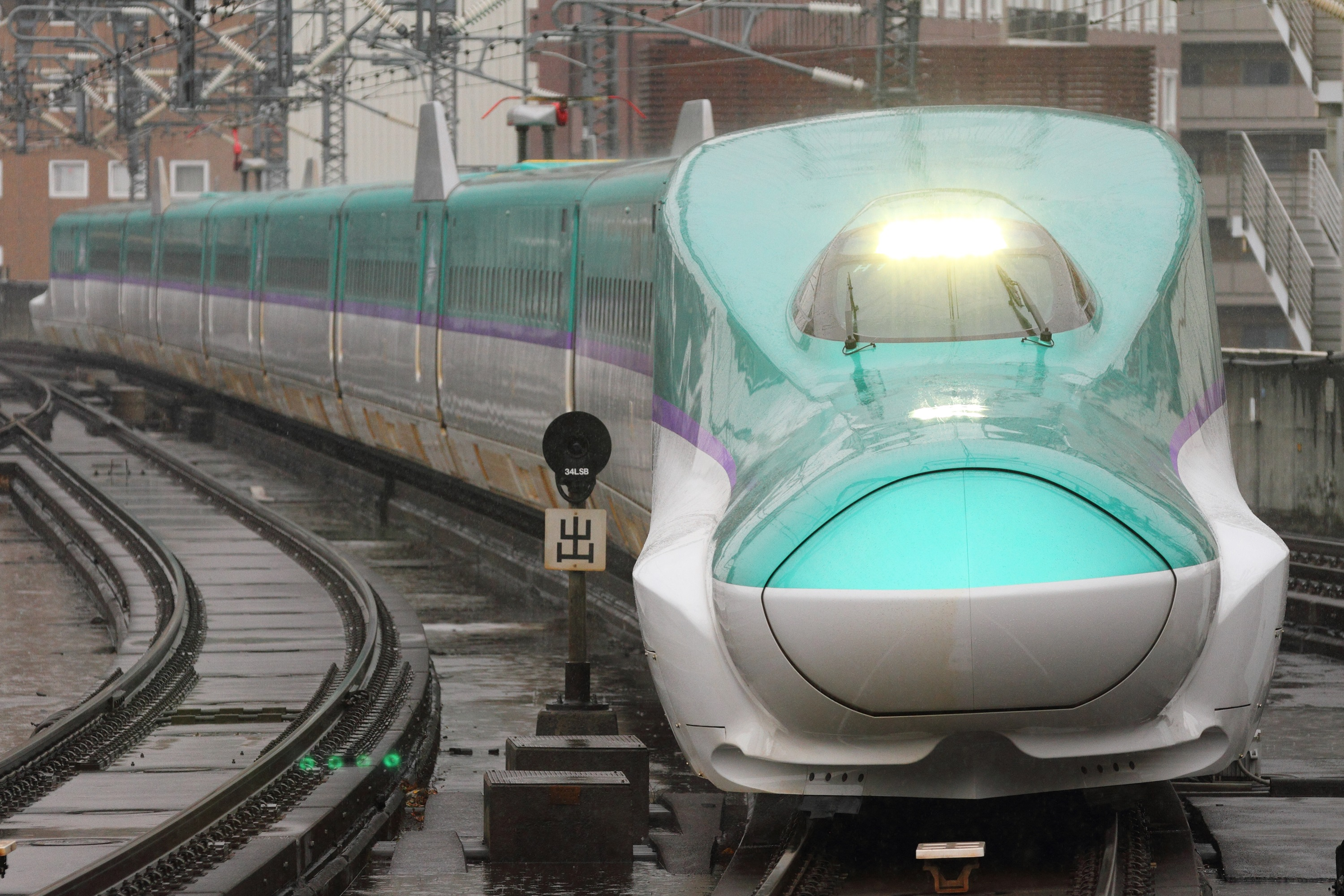
H5 series set H1 on test in November 2015

Details of the new H5 series trains on order were announced by JR Hokkaido in April 2014. The first set, H1, was shipped from Kawasaki Heavy Industries in Kobe to Hakodate Depot in October 2014. The second set was also delivered in October 2014.

In November 2014, JR Hokkaido officially announced details of the body side logos to be applied to the trains, combining an outline of Hokkaido with an image intended to portray the gyrfalcon native to Hokkaido.

Slow-speed test-running on the Hokkaido Shinkansen tracks within Hokkaido commenced from 1 December 2014, with the maximum speed of 260 km/h reached on 26 December. Test-running on the Tōhoku Shinkansen south of Shin-Aomori commenced in November 2015.

== Fleet list ==
=== E5 ===
Set U1 was the prototype set and originally numbered S11, it was modified February 2013.

As of 6 August 2023, the fleet is as follows.

Set number	Manufacturer	Date delivered
U1	Hitachi/Kawasaki	15 June 2009
U2	Kawasaki	13 December 2010
U3	Hitachi	31 January 2011
U4	Hitachi	18 February 2011
U5	Hitachi	19 August 2011
U6	Kawasaki	27 September 2011
U7	Hitachi	13 October 2011
U8	Kawasaki	14 November 2011
U9	Kawasaki	5 December 2011
U10	Hitachi	30 January 2012
U11	Kawasaki	17 February 2012
U12	Kawasaki	2 April 2012
U13	Hitachi	26 April 2012
U14	Kawasaki	31 May 2012
U15	Hitachi	11 June 2012
U16	Hitachi	26 July 2012
U17	Kawasaki	24 August 2012
U18	Kawasaki	14 September 2012
U19	Kawasaki	12 October 2012
U20	Hitachi	22 November 2012
U21	Kawasaki	25 December 2012
U22	Hitachi	31 January 2013
U23	Kawasaki	22 February 2013
U24	Hitachi	28 March 2013
U25	Kawasaki	10 April 2013
U26	Hitachi	30 May 2013
U27	Kawasaki	7 June 2013
U28	Hitachi	26 July 2013
U29	Kawasaki	7 December 2015
U30	Hitachi	15 January 2016
U31	Kawasaki	1 February 2016
U32	Hitachi	3 February 2017
U33	Kawasaki	16 January 2017
U34	Hitachi	13 October 2017
U35	Kawasaki	19 July 2017
U36	Kawasaki	25 August 2017
U37	Kawasaki	21 September 2017
U38	Kawasaki	9 February 2018
U39	Hitachi	24 August 2018
U40	Hitachi	11 January 2019
U41	Kawasaki	23 March 2018
U42	Hitachi	4 February 2019
U43	Kawasaki	4 March 2019
U44	Hitachi	29 May 2019
U45	Hitachi	25 February 2020
U46	Kawasaki	21 September 2021
U47	Kawasaki	25 April 2023
U48	Kawasaki	26 June 2023
U49	Hitachi	6 July 2023
U50	Hitachi	4 September 2023
U51	Hitachi	16 October 2023

=== H5 ===
Set H2 was withdrawn in April 2022 following damage sustained from the 2022 Fukushima earthquake. The set was dismantled as of December 2022, and later moved to a Shinkansen depot in Nanae, Hokkaido where it will be used for staff training.

As of 1 October 2021, the H5 series fleet is as follows.

Set number	Manufacturer	Date delivered	Date withdrawn
H1	Kawasaki	1 November 2014	
H2	Hitachi	8 November 2014	16 September 2022
H3	Kawasaki	23 May 2015	
H4	Kawasaki	3 August 2015	

== Accidents and incidents ==
H5 series set H2, coupled with E6 series set Z9 and operating as Yamabiko No. 223 bound for Sendai, derailed during the 2022 Fukushima earthquake while traveling between Fukushima and Shiroishi-Zaō stations. There were no injuries on board, but set H2 was withdrawn from service due to damaged sustained from the earthquake.

== Planned export to India ==
The E5 series trains with a red and grey livery were chosen for use on the under-construction Mumbai–Ahmedabad high-speed rail corridor in India. A total of 24 trains were planned to be purchased while the deal for the first six was intended to be signed by the end of March 2024.

Hitachi and Kawasaki Heavy Industries started talks with Indian Railways on design changes such as the modification of the air conditioning system in order for it to operate efficiently at temperatures up to 50 degrees Celsius. One of the goals of Indian Railways was to replace the high-end technical offerings on Japan's train sets with indigenous bio-toilets. Similarly, the primary languages for documentation of facility usage instructions was to be Hindi and English.

A thorough technical study was commissioned by National High Speed Rail Corporation Limited with HKC Consortium in Japan. The goal was to determine the adjustments needed for the rolling stock to run efficiently under Indian climatic conditions. The existing HVAC systems are usually sufficient, but a few minor layout adjustments are needed to maximize performance. To control dust levels, filter cleaning frequency must increase. The heavier weight of the cooling equipment was a hurdle throughout the redesign phase since it could affect energy efficiency. The power needed to maintain high speeds rises with weight, which may have an impact on the train's overall performance. To make matters more complicated, Indian passengers' average weight, including their luggage, is greater than that of Japanese passengers. A weight calculation analysis showed that simply by providing fewer seats, the Shinkansen in India could keep its weight similar to that of Japan's.

However, due to increasing costs and postponements in delivery, India moved to consider indigenously built trains. In April 2025, it was reported that Japan will provide India with two Shinkansen train sets, the E5 series and the E3 series, to support the testing and interim operation. These would operate in parallel with 280 km/h sets developed by India's Integral Coach Factory in collaboration with BEML. Following this, E10 series Shinkansen trains will be delivered in 2030.

== In media ==
The E5 series is featured in the anime Shinkansen Henkei Robo Shinkalion as the "Shinkalion E5 Hayabusa". The H5 series also is featured, referred to as the "Shinkalion H5 Hayabusa". Both trainset types have been featured in all current installments of the franchise.

The E5 series is featured in the film Bullet Train Explosion. The H5 series is also briefly seen in the same film.

== See also ==
- List of high-speed trains
